= Porto =

City in Portugal

Porto Oporto
- Municipality
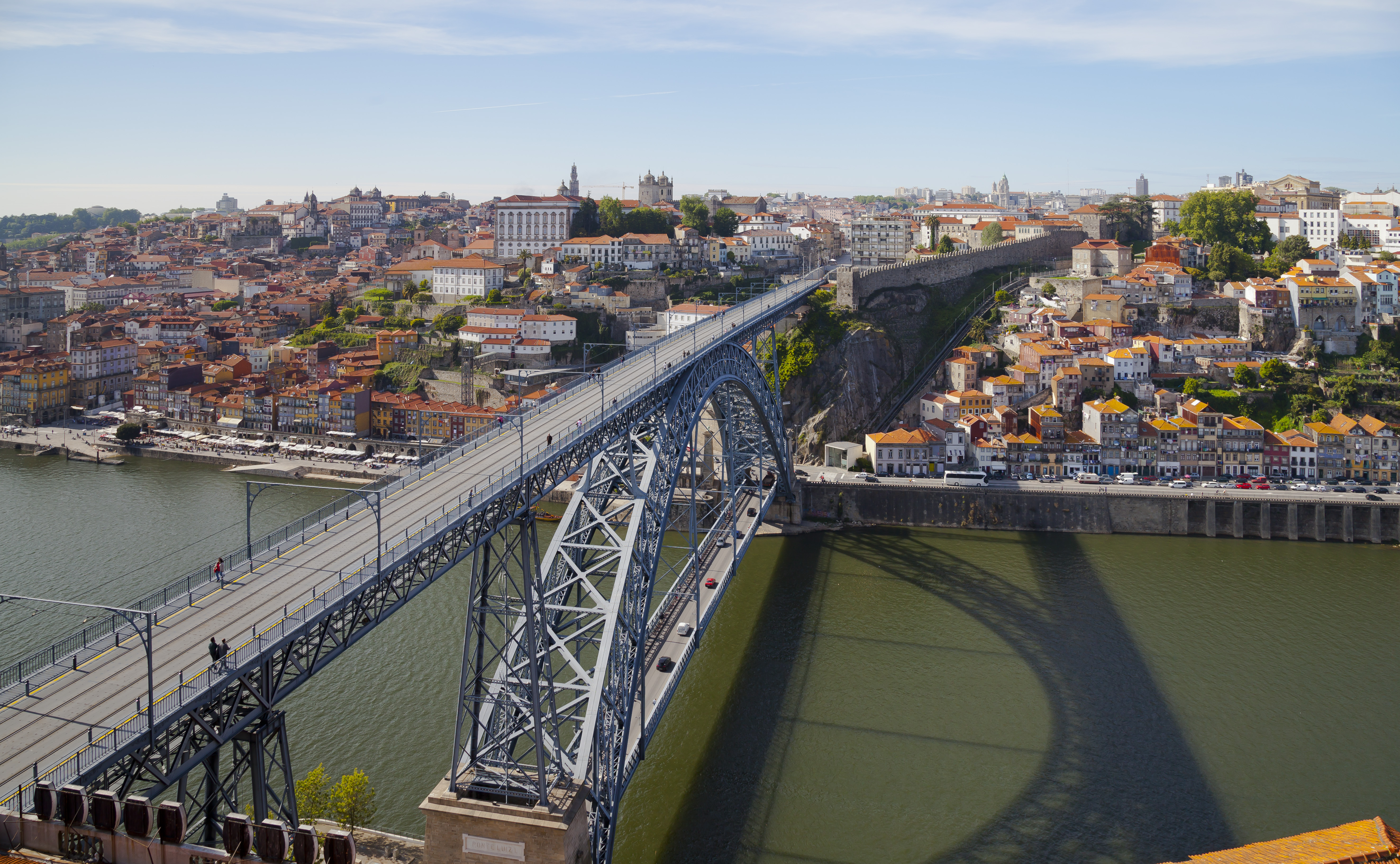
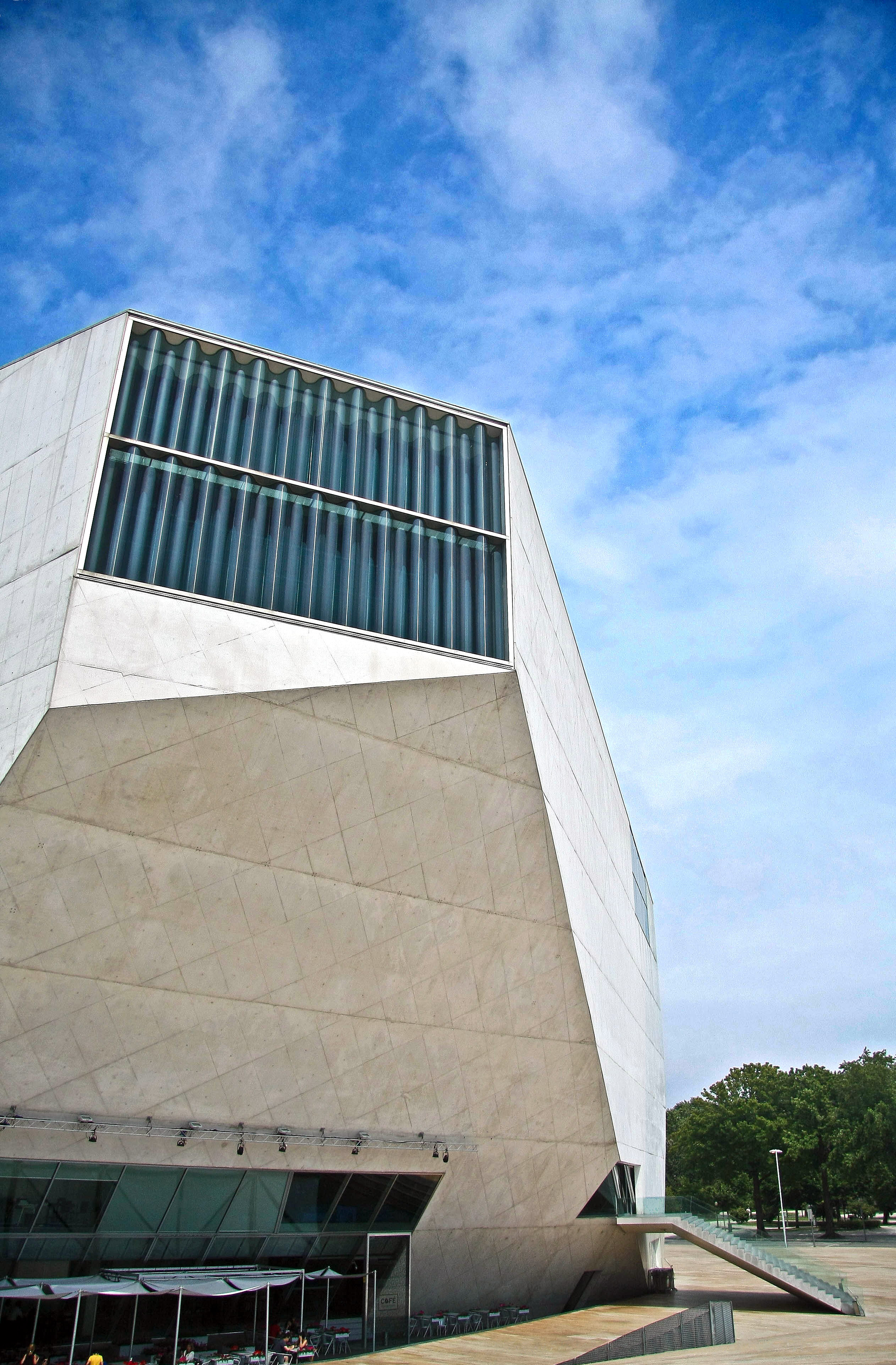
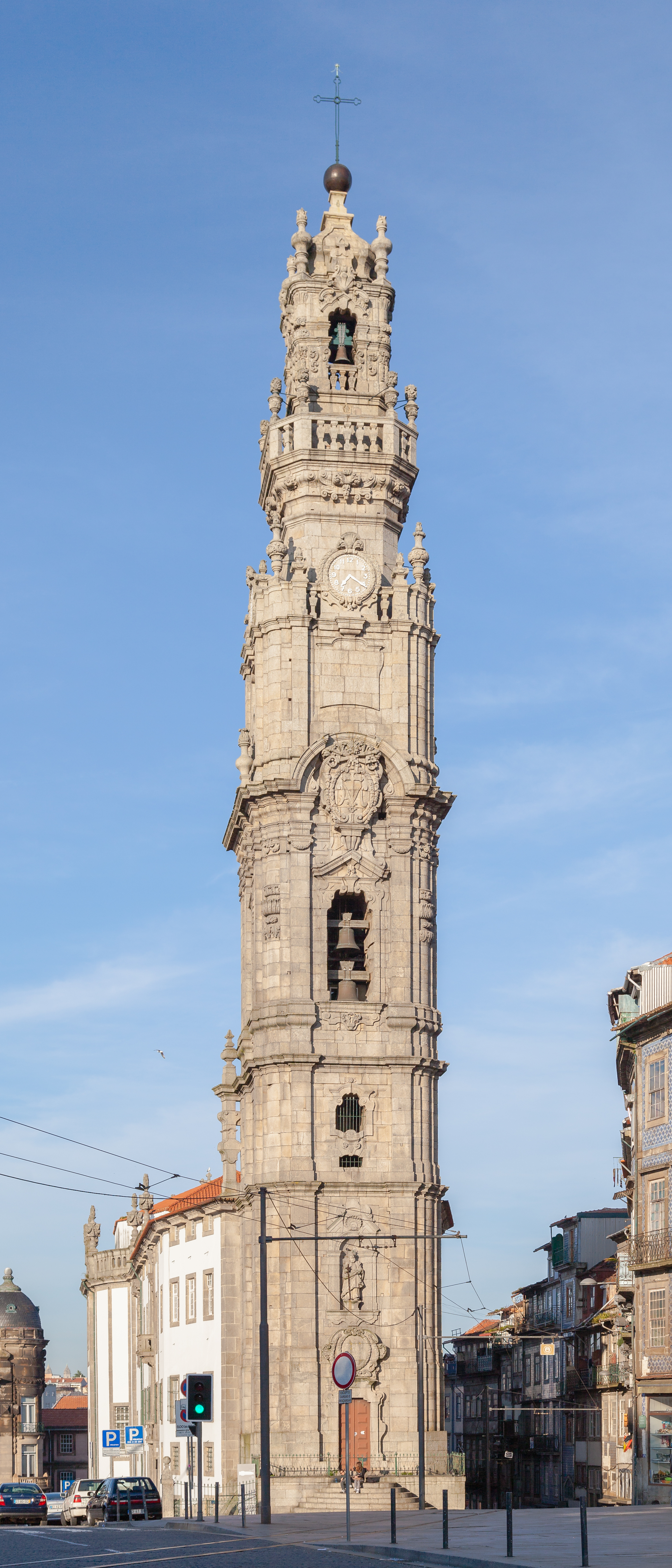
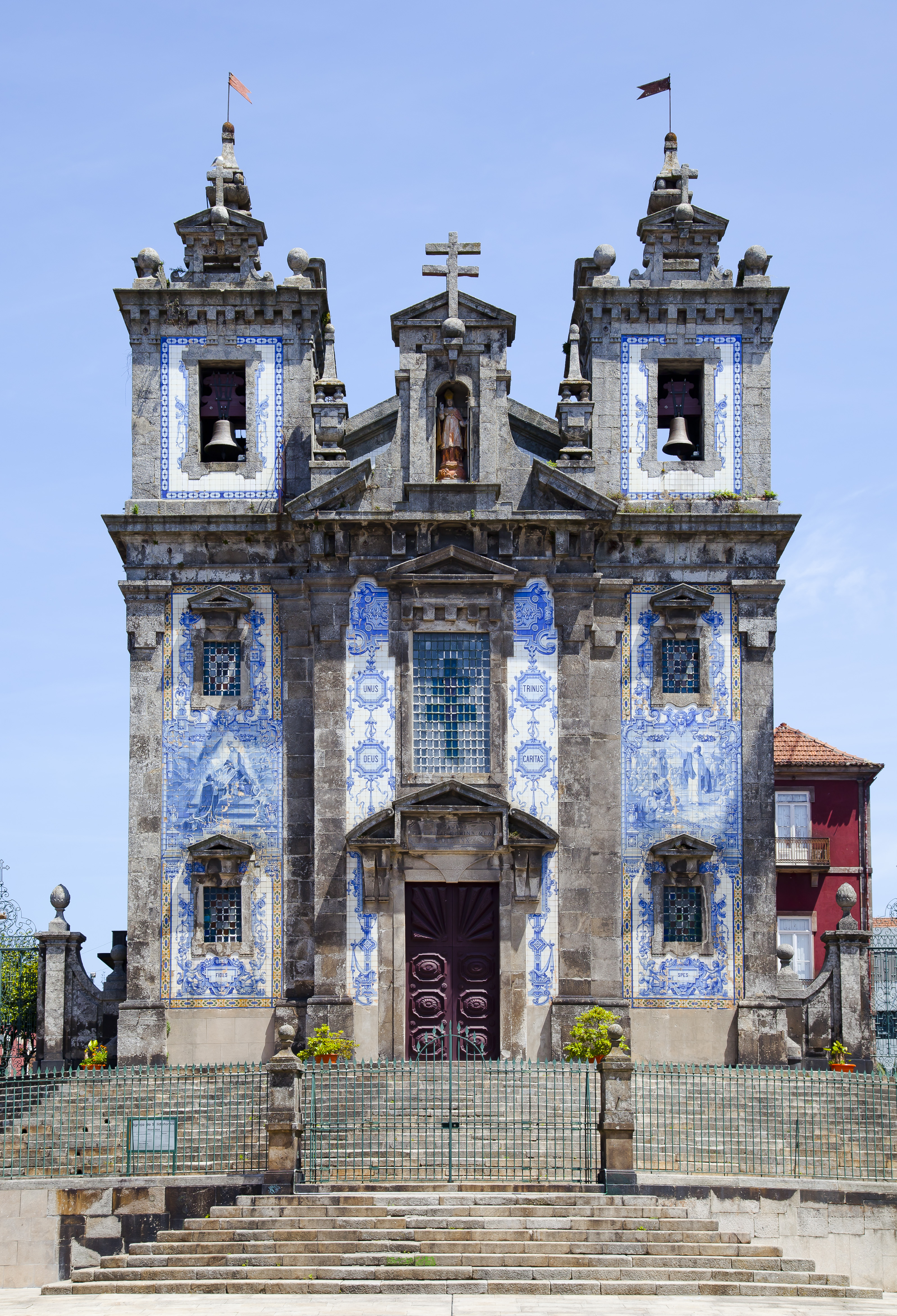
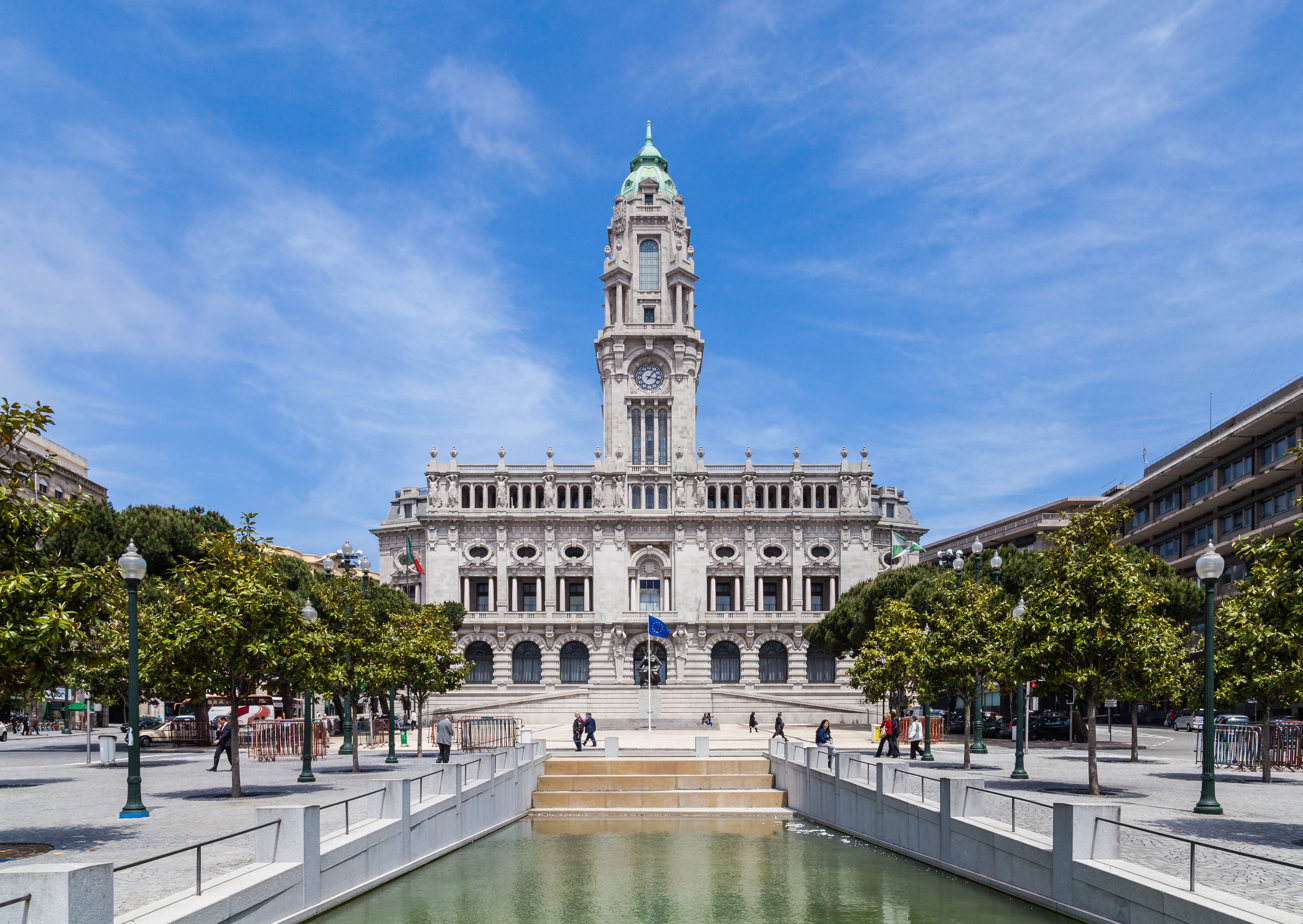
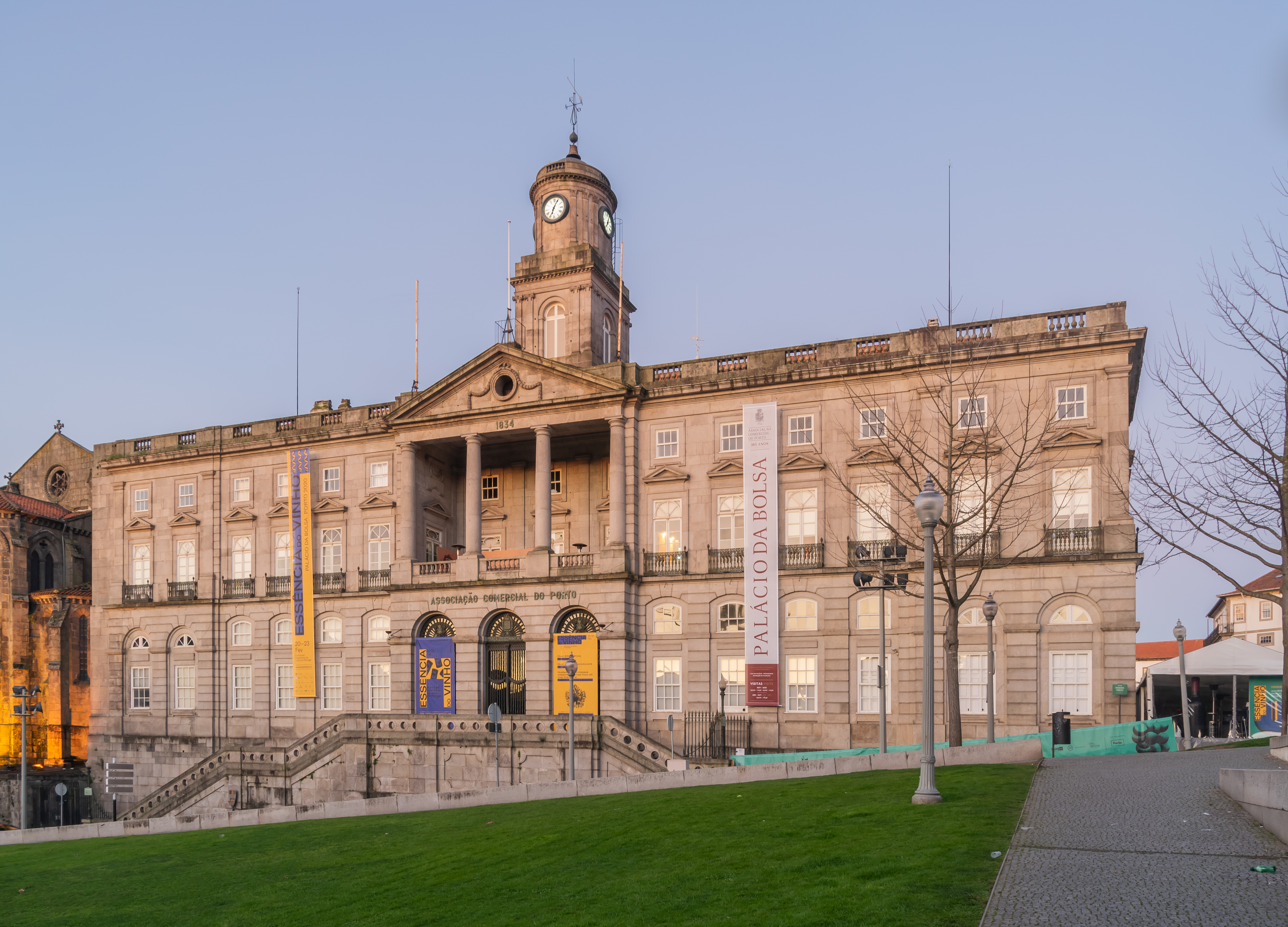
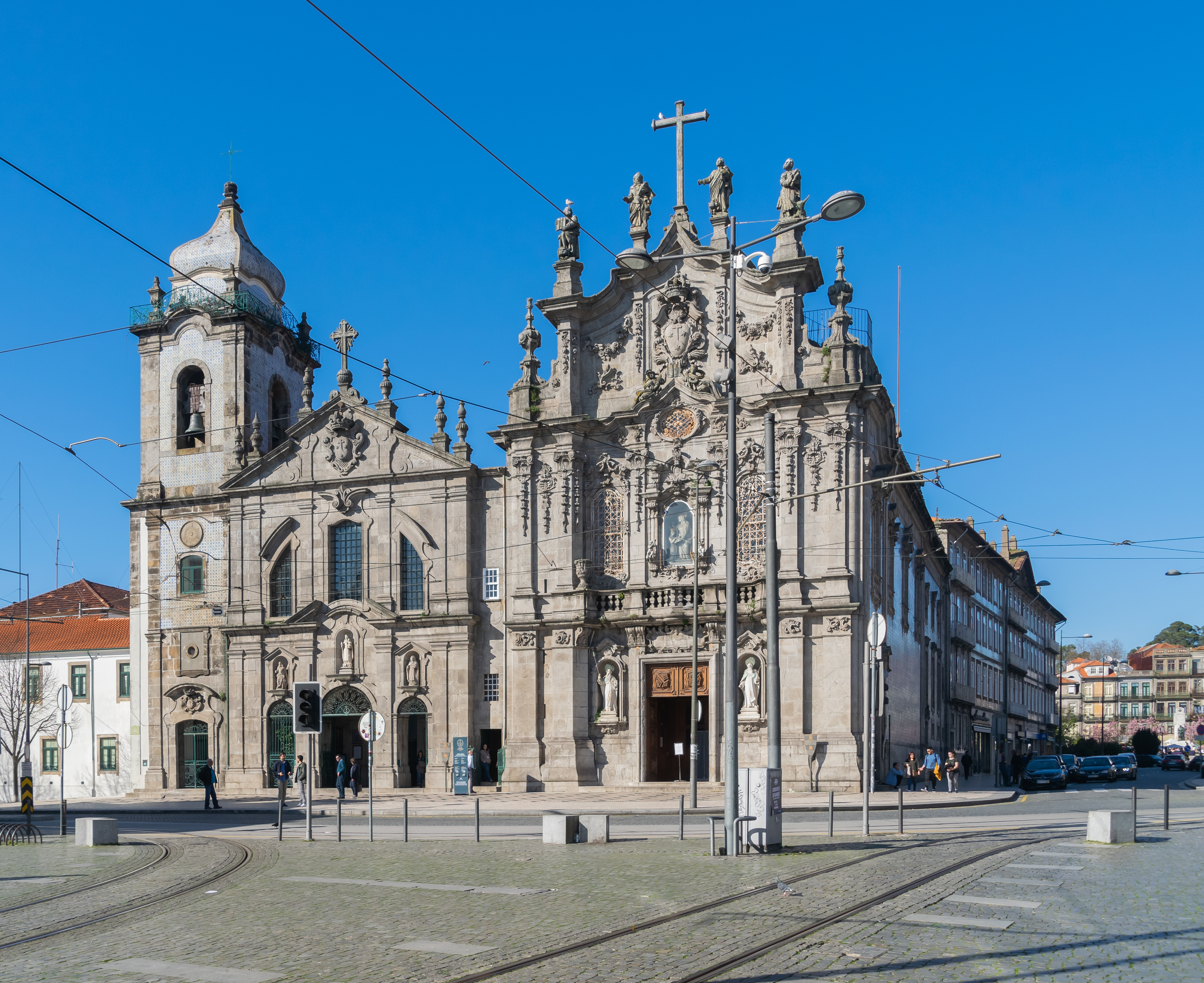
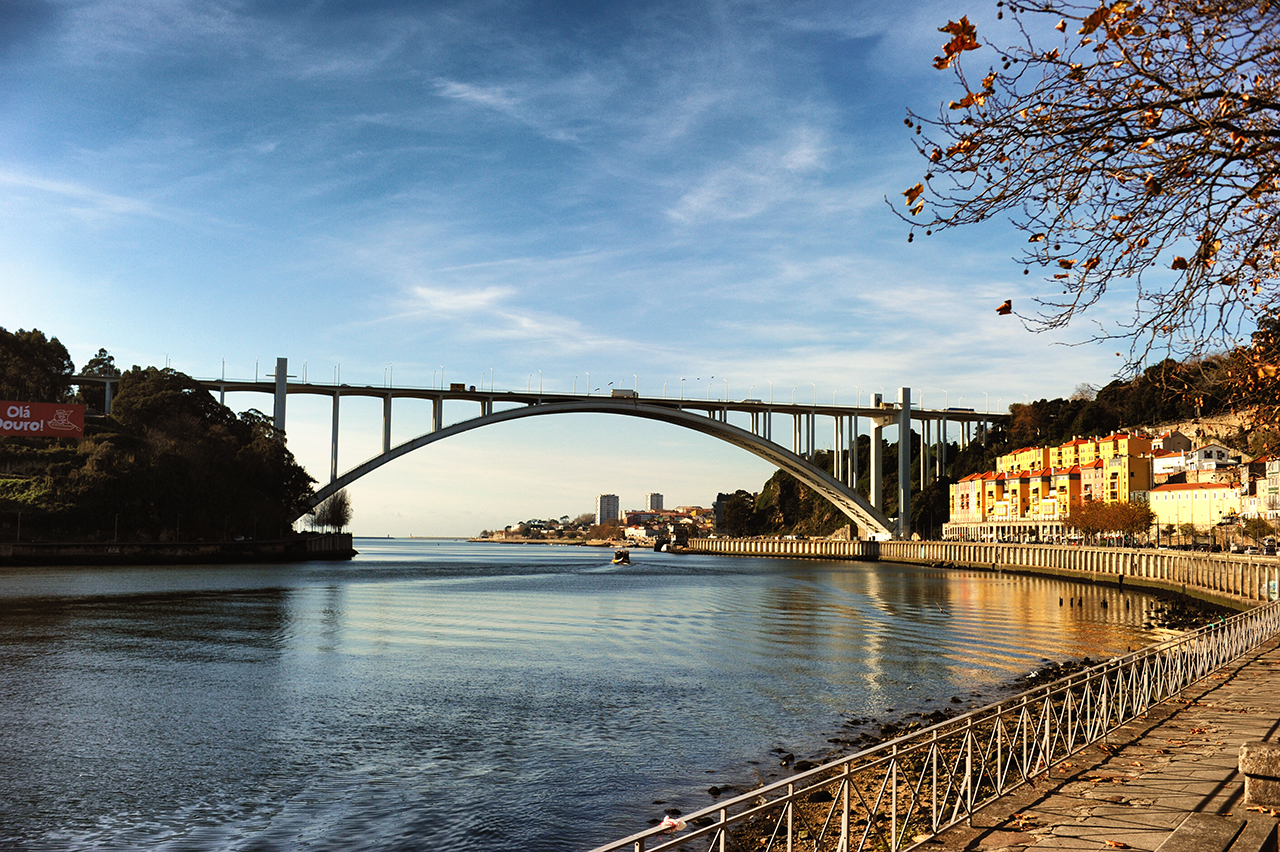
- View of Ribeira and Dom Luís I Bridge from Vila Nova de Gaia Casa da Música Torre dos Clérigos Church of Saint Ildefonso City Hall Palácio da Bolsa Carmelitas Church Arrábida Bridge

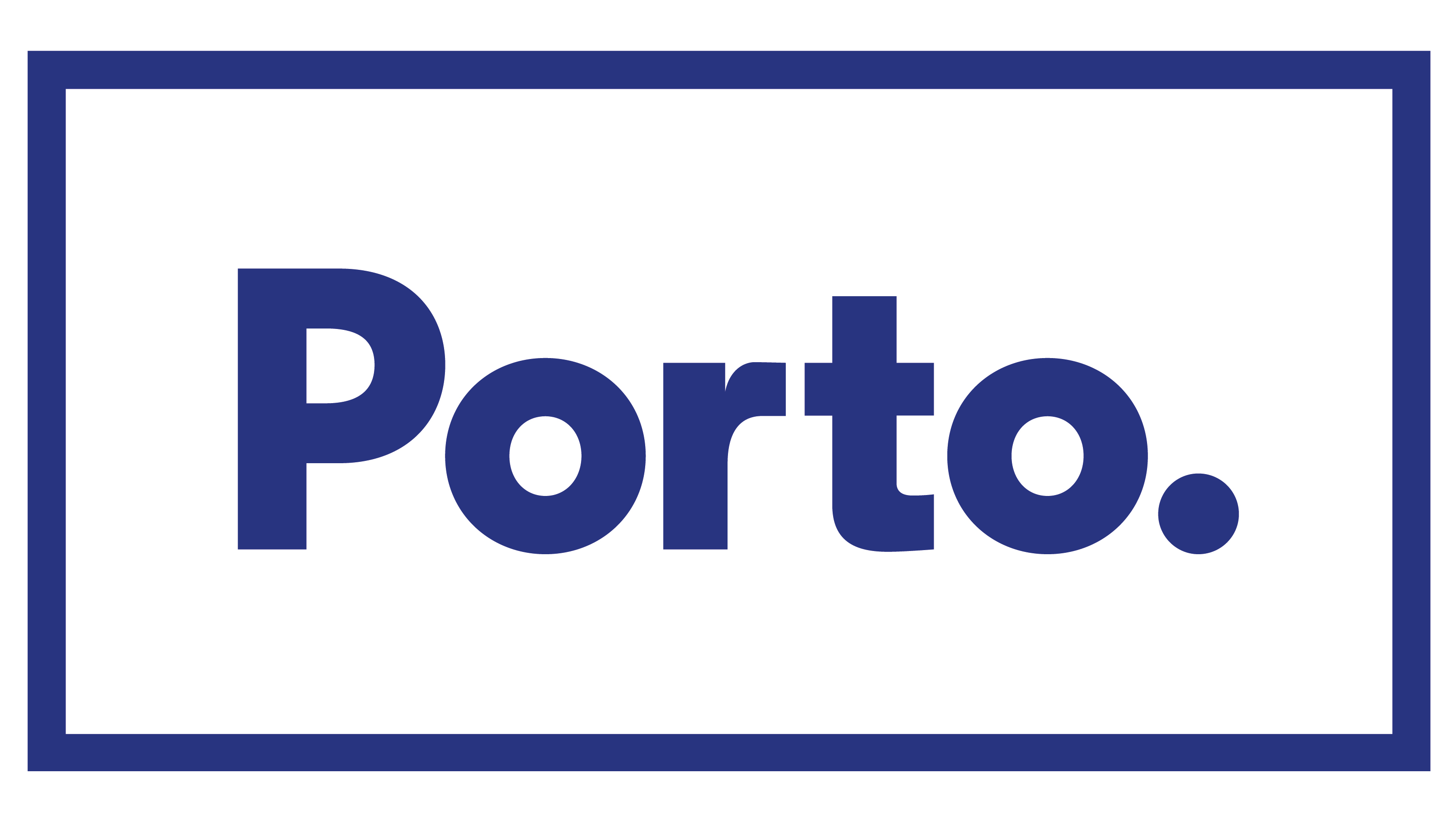
- Flag Coat of arms Brandmark
- Nicknames: A Cidade Invicta ("The Undefeated City"), A Cidade da Virgem ("The City of the Virgin")
- Interactive map of Porto
- Location within Portugal Location within Europe
- Coordinates: 41°09′00″N 8°36′39″W
- Country: Portugal
- Region: North Portugal
- Metro: Porto metropolitan area
- District: Porto
- Historical province: Entre Douro e Minho
- Settlement: 275 BC
- Municipality: Porto
- Seat: Porto Municipal Chamber
- Civil parishes: 7

Government
  - Type: LAU
  - Body: Câmara Municipal
  - Mayor: Pedro Duarte (PSD-CDS–PP-IL)
  - Municipal Assembly Chair: Miguel Pereira Leite

Area
  - Municipality: 41.42 km^{2} (15.99 sq mi)
- Elevation: 104 m (341 ft)

Population (2025)
  - Municipality: 273,476
  - Rank: 2nd
  - Density: 6,100.6/km^{2} (15,800/sq mi)
  - Urban: 1,422,840
  - Metro: 1,861,727
- Time zone: UTC0 (WET)
  - Summer (DST): UTC+1 (WEST)
- Postal Zone: 4000-286 Porto
- Area code: (+351) 22
- Demonym: Portuense, Tripeiro (informal)
- Patron Saint: Our Lady of Vendôme
- Municipal Holidays: 24 June (São João)
- Website: www.cm-porto.pt
- Geographic detail from CAOP (2010) produced by Instituto Geográfico Português (IGP)

UNESCO World Heritage Site
- Official name: Historic Centre of Oporto, Luís I Bridge and Monastery of Serra do Pilar
- Criteria: iv
- Reference: 755
- Inscription: 1996 (20th Session)

Porto, (Note: Portuguese pronunciation: [ˈpoɾtu]) also known in English as Oporto, (Note: Pronounced /əˈpɔːrtoʊ, oʊˈpɔːrtuː/ ə-POR-toh, oh-POR-too, also British English: /ɒˈpɔːrtoʊ/ o-POR-toh, American English: /oʊˈpɔːrtoʊ/ oh-POR-toh. From the Portuguese name with its definite article, o Porto ("the Port" or "the Harbor").) is the second largest city in Portugal, after Lisbon. It is the capital of the Porto District and one of the Iberian Peninsula's major urban areas. Porto city proper, which is the entire municipality of Porto, is small compared to its metropolitan area, with an estimated population of 273,476 people in a municipal area of 41.42 km^{2} (16 sq mi). As of 2025, the Porto metropolitan area has around 1.9 million people in an area of 2,395 km^{2} (925 sq mi), making it the second-largest urban area in Portugal. It is recognized as a global city with a Gamma + rating from the Globalization and World Cities Research Network.

On the Douro River estuary in northern Portugal, Porto is one of the oldest European centers, and its core was named a World Heritage Site by UNESCO in 1996, as the Historic Centre of Porto, Luiz I Bridge and Monastery of Serra do Pilar. The historic area is also a National Monument of Portugal. The western part of its urban area extends to the coastline of the Atlantic Ocean. Settlement dates back to the 2nd century BC, when it was an outpost of the Roman Republic. Its combined Celtic-Latin name, Portus Cale, has been referred to as the origin of the name Portugal, based on transliteration and oral evolution from Latin.

Port wine, one of Portugal's most famous exports, is named after Porto, as the metropolitan area, and in particular the cellars of Vila Nova de Gaia, were responsible for the packaging, transport, and export of fortified wine. Porto is on the Portuguese Way path of the Camino de Santiago. Livraria Lello uses timed entry, while several port wine cellars in Vila Nova de Gaia offer guided tours and tastings. In 2023, Porto was named City of the Year by Food and Travel magazine. In 2024, the city was named World's Leading Seaside Metropolitan Destination at the World Travel Awards.

== History ==
=== Early history ===
Before the Roman conquest, the region was inhabited by the Gallaeci, a Celtic people. Archaeological ruins from this period have been uncovered in several locations. Findings suggest that human settlements existed at the mouth of the Douro River as early as the 8th century BC, possibly indicating the presence of a Phoenician trading post.

Under the Roman Empire, Porto (then known as Portus Cale) developed into a significant commercial hub, facilitating trade between Olissipona (modern Lisbon) and Bracara Augusta (modern Braga). During the Suebian and Visigothic periods, it emerged as a key center for the spread of Christianity.

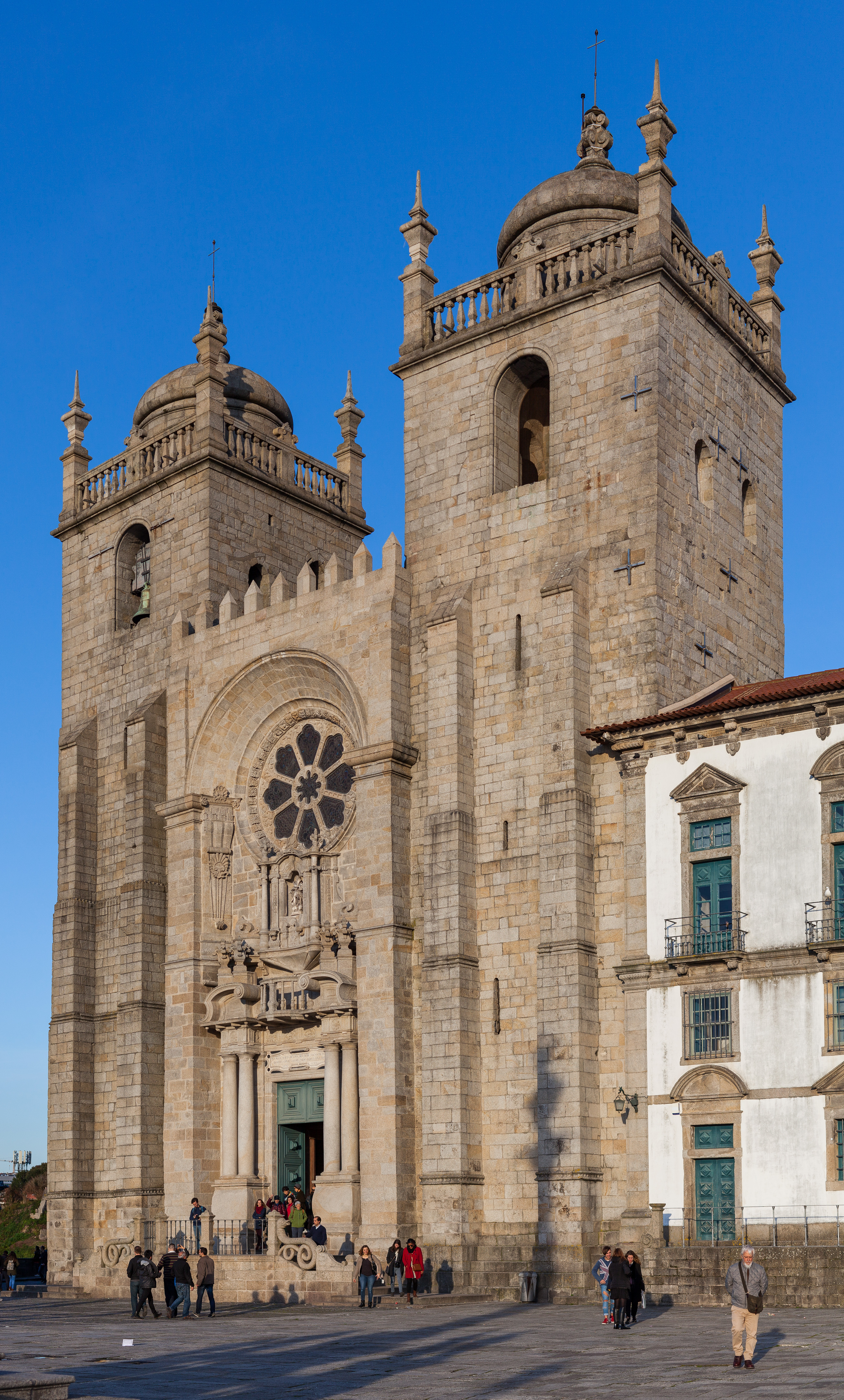
Porto Cathedral, built in the 12th century with Baroque and modern additions

Between 714 and 716, Porto came under Muslim control following the Umayyad conquest of Hispania. It was reconquered by Christian forces under Alfonso I of Asturias in 741, establishing Porto as a fortified Christian frontier town.

In 868, Vímara Peres, a Galician nobleman and vassal of Alfonso III of León, was granted the fief of Portucale. He repopulated and fortified the area between the Minho and Douro rivers, founding the County of Portucale—later known as the County of Portugal.

In 1093, Teresa of León, illegitimate daughter of Alfonso VI of Castile, married Henry of Burgundy, who received the County of Portugal as dowry. Under their son, Afonso I of Portugal, the region declared independence in the 12th century and became the nucleus of the Portuguese nation-state.

In 1387, Porto hosted the marriage of John I of Portugal and Philippa of Lancaster, cementing the Anglo-Portuguese alliance, which remains the oldest enduring military alliance in the world.

By the 15th century, Porto had become a prominent shipbuilding and maritime center. In 1415, Prince Henry the Navigator launched the Conquest of Ceuta from Porto, initiating the Portuguese Age of Discovery. The nickname tripeiros (tripe-eaters) originates from this period, when better meat cuts were sent on naval expeditions, leaving tripe for the locals. The dish Tripas à moda do Porto remains emblematic of the city's culinary identity.

=== 18th century ===
Since the 13th century, wines from Douro Valley had been transported to Porto in flat-bottomed barcos rabelos. The Methuen Treaty of 1703 strengthened commercial and military ties with England. By 1717, English firms had established trading posts in Porto and began dominating the port wine trade. In response, Prime Minister Marquis of Pombal created a state-controlled wine company and demarcated the Douro region—Europe's first protected wine region. This led to the 1757 Revolta dos Borrachos ("revolt of the drunkards"), during which company buildings were attacked, but that was brutally suppressed by the authorities.

Between 1732 and 1763, architect Nicolau Nasoni designed the Clérigos Church and its tower, now a city icon. The 18th and 19th centuries saw Porto's emergence as an industrial center.

=== 19th century ===
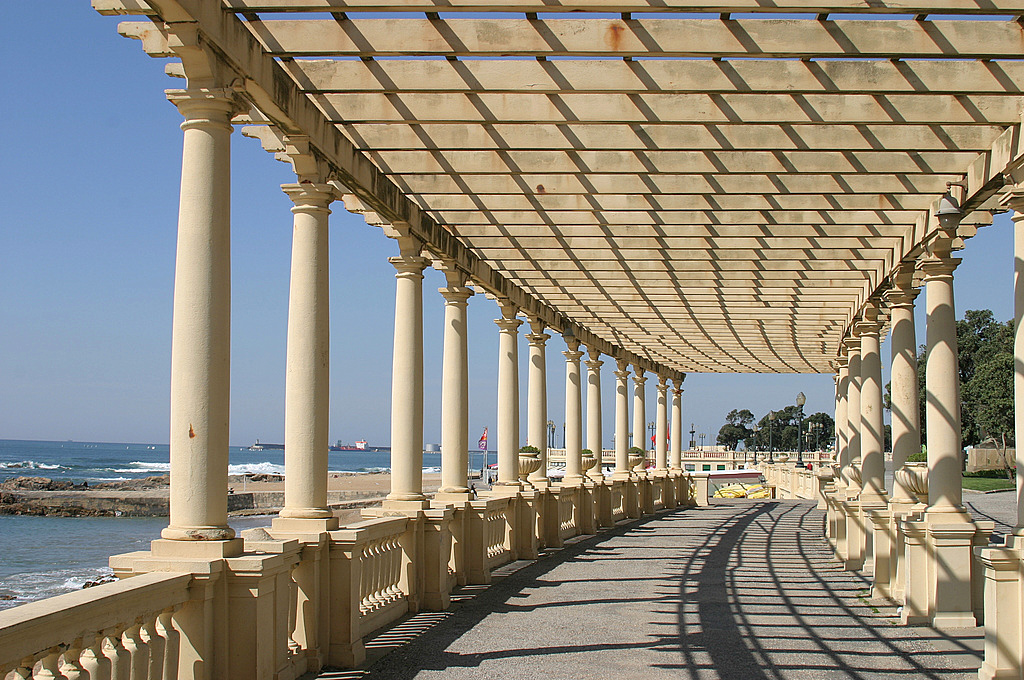
Pergola along the coast in the Foz neighbourhood

In 1806, Porto built the floating pontoon bridge known as the Ponte das Barcas. During the Peninsular War, French forces under Jean-de-Dieu Soult invaded the city. On 29 March 1809, thousands of civilians attempting to flee across the bridge caused it to collapse, resulting in an estimated 4,000 deaths—the deadliest bridge disaster in history.

Shortly after, British commander Arthur Wellesley, 1st Duke of Wellington led a successful counterattack in the Second Battle of Porto, crossing the Douro River using wine barges and retaking the city.

The Liberal Revolution of 1820 began in Porto, advocating a constitutional monarchy and the return of John VI of Portugal from Brazil. Although a liberal constitution was enacted in 1822, a civil war erupted when Miguel I of Portugal seized power in 1828. Porto endured an 18-month siege (1832–1833) by absolutist forces. The city's resistance earned it the epithet Cidade Invicta ("Unvanquished City").

The Ponte das Barcas was replaced by the Ponte D. Maria II (1843), later followed by Gustave Eiffel's Maria Pia Bridge (1877). Eiffel's former partner Théophile Seyrig designed the Dom Luís I Bridge, opened in 1886.

Other civic developments included the founding of the nautical school Aula de Náutica (1762), and the stock exchange (Bolsa do Porto, 1834–1910).

The 31 January 1891 republican revolt, the first of its kind in Portugal, occurred in Porto and contributed to the fall of the monarchy in 1910.

=== 20th and 21st centuries ===
On 19 January 1919, monarchist forces declared the Monarchy of the North in Porto during a brief counter-revolution. Although the movement was short-lived, Porto briefly served as the capital of the restored monarchy before republican forces regained control.

The Historic Centre of Porto was designated a UNESCO World Heritage Site in 1996. In 2001, Porto shared the title of European Capital of Culture with Rotterdam, initiating major cultural and infrastructural development projects.

== Geography ==
Located approximately 280 km (170 miles) north of Lisbon, the historic center of Porto was designated a UNESCO World Heritage Site in 1996. Among the city's architectural landmarks, the Porto Cathedral is the oldest surviving structure, along with the small Romanesque Church of Cedofeita, the Gothic Church of Saint Francis, remnants of the defensive city walls, and several 15th-century houses.

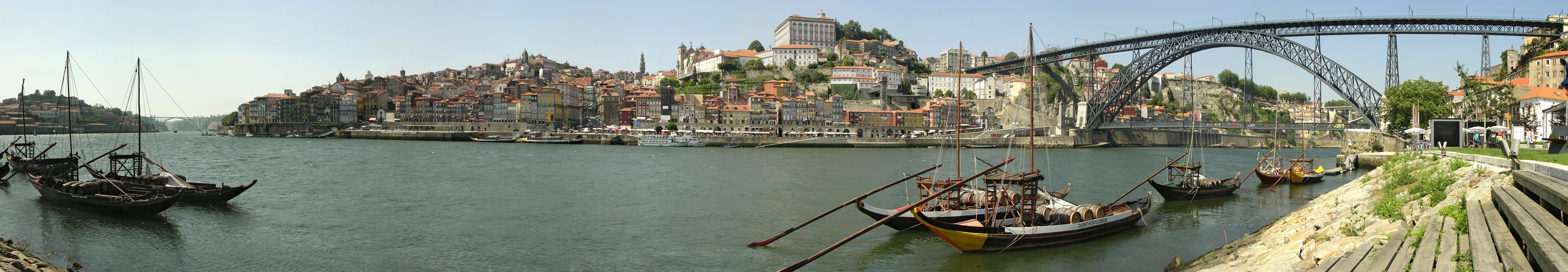
Historical part of Porto, seen from Vila Nova de Gaia, through the Douro river.

The Baroque style is richly represented in the ornate interior decoration of the churches of São Francisco and Santa Clara, as well as in the churches of Misericórdia and Clérigos, the Episcopal Palace of Porto, and others. The 19th and 20th centuries introduced Neoclassical and Romantic influences, contributing notable landmarks such as the Stock Exchange Palace (Palácio da Bolsa), the Hospital of Saint Anthony, the city hall, the buildings of Liberdade Square and Avenida dos Aliados, the tile-adorned São Bento railway station, and the gardens of the Palácio de Cristal. A guided visit to the Palácio da Bolsa, particularly the Arab Room, is a major tourist attraction.

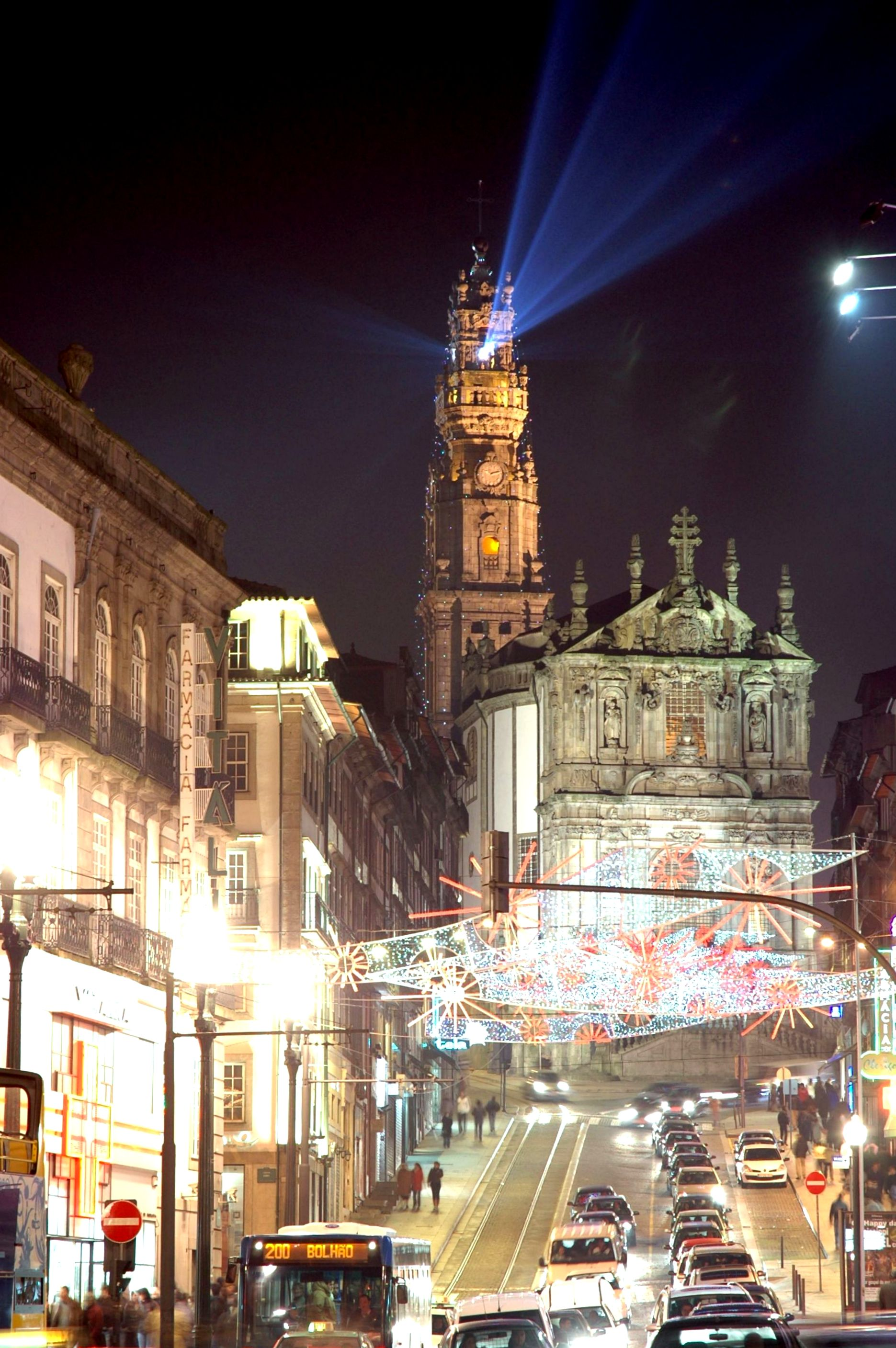
Clérigos Church and Tower

Many of Porto's oldest buildings are at risk of collapse. While the population of the municipality has decreased by nearly 100,000 since the 1980s, there has been significant growth in the number of permanent residents living in the surrounding suburbs and satellite towns.

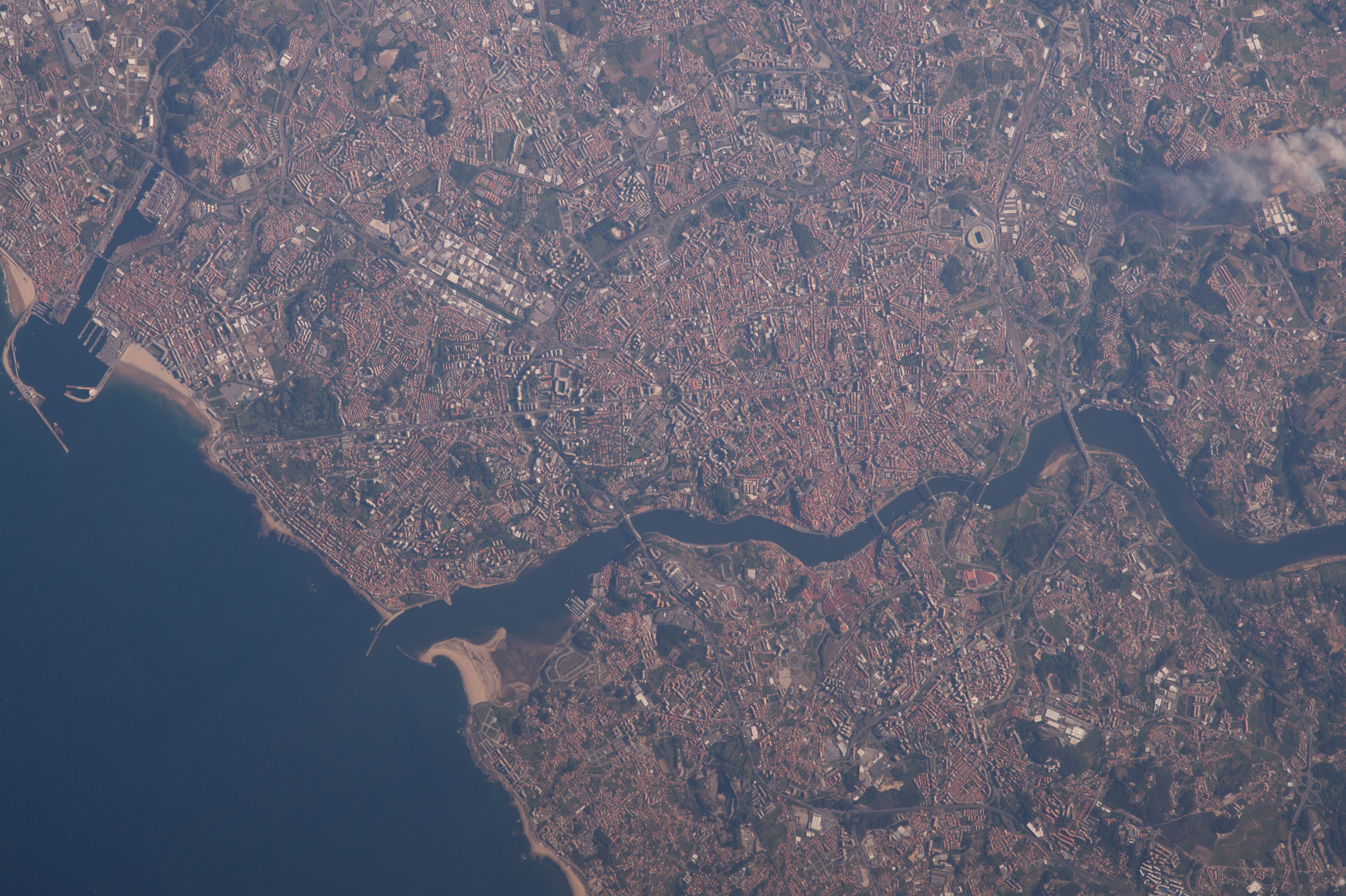
View of the Greater Porto area, with the Port of Leixões to the north of Porto and Vila Nova de Gaia to the south.

=== Administrative divisions ===
Administratively, Porto is divided into seven civil parishes (freguesias):

- Aldoar, Foz do Douro e Nevogilde
- Bonfim
- Campanhã
- Cedofeita, Santo Ildefonso, Sé, Miragaia, São Nicolau e Vitória
- Lordelo do Ouro e Massarelos
- Paranhos
- Ramalde

== Climate ==
Porto has a warm-summer Mediterranean climate (Köppen: Csb, Trewartha: Csbk), typical of the northern Iberian Peninsula. As a result, the region combines features of both the dry, warm Mediterranean climates of southern Europe and the wet marine west coast climates of the North Atlantic.

Summers are typically warm and sunny, with average temperatures between 16 and 26 °C (61 and 79 °F), occasionally reaching up to 30 °C (86 °F) during heatwaves. These hot spells are usually accompanied by low humidity. The nearby beaches are often windier and cooler than inland areas. Porto's summers are generally milder than those of inland Portuguese cities due to its proximity to the Atlantic Ocean.

Occasionally, summer weather is interrupted by brief rainy periods marked by showers and cooler temperatures around 20 °C (68 °F) in the afternoon. Annual precipitation is high, mostly concentrated in winter, making Porto one of the wettest major cities in Europe. Nonetheless, prolonged sunny intervals are common even during the rainiest months.

Winters are mild and damp. Temperatures usually range from around 5/6 °C (41/43 °F) in the morning to 14/15°C (57/59 °F) in the afternoon, and seldom drop below freezing. While long periods of rainfall are typical, sunny breaks also occur during the winter season.

Climate data for Porto (Fontainhas), elevation: 93 m, 1981–2010 normals, extremes 1981–2007, sunshine & humidity 1961–1990
Month	Jan	Feb	Mar	Apr	May	Jun	Jul	Aug	Sep	Oct	Nov	Dec	Year
Record high °C (°F)	23.3 (73.9)	23.2 (73.8)	28.5 (83.3)	30.2 (86.4)	34.1 (93.4)	38.7 (101.7)	40.3 (104.5)	40.9 (105.6)	36.9 (98.4)	32.2 (90.0)	26.3 (79.3)	24.8 (76.6)	40.9 (105.6)
Mean daily maximum °C (°F)	13.8 (56.8)	15.0 (59.0)	17.4 (63.3)	18.1 (64.6)	20.1 (68.2)	23.5 (74.3)	25.3 (77.5)	25.7 (78.3)	24.1 (75.4)	20.7 (69.3)	17.1 (62.8)	14.4 (57.9)	19.6 (67.3)
Daily mean °C (°F)	9.5 (49.1)	10.4 (50.7)	12.6 (54.7)	13.7 (56.7)	15.9 (60.6)	19.0 (66.2)	20.6 (69.1)	20.8 (69.4)	19.5 (67.1)	16.4 (61.5)	13.0 (55.4)	10.7 (51.3)	15.2 (59.4)
Mean daily minimum °C (°F)	5.2 (41.4)	5.9 (42.6)	7.8 (46.0)	9.1 (48.4)	11.6 (52.9)	14.5 (58.1)	15.9 (60.6)	15.9 (60.6)	14.7 (58.5)	12.2 (54.0)	8.9 (48.0)	6.9 (44.4)	10.7 (51.3)
Record low °C (°F)	−3.3 (26.1)	−2.8 (27.0)	−1.6 (29.1)	0.1 (32.2)	3.3 (37.9)	5.6 (42.1)	9.5 (49.1)	8.0 (46.4)	5.5 (41.9)	1.4 (34.5)	−0.3 (31.5)	−1.2 (29.8)	−3.3 (26.1)
Average precipitation mm (inches)	147.1 (5.79)	110.5 (4.35)	95.6 (3.76)	117.6 (4.63)	89.6 (3.53)	39.9 (1.57)	20.4 (0.80)	32.9 (1.30)	71.9 (2.83)	158.3 (6.23)	172.0 (6.77)	181.0 (7.13)	1,237 (48.7)
Average relative humidity (%)	81.0	80.0	75.0	74.0	74.0	74.0	73.0	73.0	76.0	80.0	81.0	81.0	76.8
Mean monthly sunshine hours	124.0	129.0	192.0	217.0	258.0	274.0	308.0	295.0	224.0	184.0	139.0	124.0	2,468
Source 1: IPMA
Source 2: NOAA

Climate data for Porto Airport, elevation: 68 m, 1991–2020 normals, 1981-2020 extremes
Month	Jan	Feb	Mar	Apr	May	Jun	Jul	Aug	Sep	Oct	Nov	Dec	Year
Record high °C (°F)	22.8 (73.0)	24.4 (75.9)	29.1 (84.4)	30.6 (87.1)	33.5 (92.3)	38.3 (100.9)	37.9 (100.2)	38.6 (101.5)	37.6 (99.7)	33.1 (91.6)	25.6 (78.1)	24.8 (76.6)	38.6 (101.5)
Mean daily maximum °C (°F)	14.0 (57.2)	15.0 (59.0)	17.0 (62.6)	18.1 (64.6)	20.3 (68.5)	22.7 (72.9)	24.3 (75.7)	24.8 (76.6)	23.5 (74.3)	20.7 (69.3)	16.8 (62.2)	14.7 (58.5)	19.3 (66.8)
Daily mean °C (°F)	10.2 (50.4)	10.9 (51.6)	12.9 (55.2)	14.1 (57.4)	16.3 (61.3)	18.6 (65.5)	19.9 (67.8)	20.2 (68.4)	19.2 (66.6)	16.8 (62.2)	13.1 (55.6)	11.1 (52.0)	15.3 (59.5)
Mean daily minimum °C (°F)	6.4 (43.5)	6.8 (44.2)	8.8 (47.8)	10.1 (50.2)	12.3 (54.1)	14.5 (58.1)	15.5 (59.9)	15.7 (60.3)	14.8 (58.6)	12.9 (55.2)	9.4 (48.9)	7.6 (45.7)	11.2 (52.2)
Record low °C (°F)	−2.4 (27.7)	−2.3 (27.9)	−2.3 (27.9)	1.5 (34.7)	3.8 (38.8)	6.8 (44.2)	9.2 (48.6)	7.4 (45.3)	7.5 (45.5)	4.1 (39.4)	0.9 (33.6)	−0.8 (30.6)	−2.4 (27.7)
Average precipitation mm (inches)	151.0 (5.94)	97.8 (3.85)	101.1 (3.98)	95.5 (3.76)	85.6 (3.37)	33.7 (1.33)	16.6 (0.65)	29.3 (1.15)	68.2 (2.69)	148.9 (5.86)	165.9 (6.53)	153.3 (6.04)	1,146.9 (45.15)
Average precipitation days (≥ 1 mm)	12.8	10.0	9.9	10.4	8.9	4.9	3.1	3.2	5.8	11.1	13.0	12.4	105.4
Source: IPMA

Climate data for Porto (Fontainhas/Serra Do Pilar), elevation: 93 m, normals 1991–2020, extremes 1973–present
Month	Jan	Feb	Mar	Apr	May	Jun	Jul	Aug	Sep	Oct	Nov	Dec	Year
Record high °C (°F)	23.7 (74.7)	29.0 (84.2)	28.6 (83.5)	31.9 (89.4)	34.7 (94.5)	38.7 (101.7)	39.9 (103.8)	39.6 (103.3)	36.9 (98.4)	34.4 (93.9)	27.7 (81.9)	24.8 (76.6)	39.9 (103.8)
Mean daily maximum °C (°F)	13.9 (57.0)	15.4 (59.7)	17.8 (64.0)	18.3 (64.9)	20.5 (68.9)	23.5 (74.3)	25.1 (77.2)	25.6 (78.1)	23.6 (74.5)	20.6 (69.1)	16.8 (62.2)	16.8 (62.2)	19.8 (67.7)
Daily mean °C (°F)	10.2 (50.4)	10.9 (51.6)	13.5 (56.3)	14.6 (58.3)	17.0 (62.6)	19.5 (67.1)	21.3 (70.3)	21.4 (70.5)	19.3 (66.7)	16.6 (61.9)	13.4 (56.1)	11.0 (51.8)	15.7 (60.3)
Mean daily minimum °C (°F)	6.2 (43.2)	6.5 (43.7)	8.8 (47.8)	10.4 (50.7)	13.3 (55.9)	15.4 (59.7)	17.0 (62.6)	17.0 (62.6)	15.2 (59.4)	12.8 (55.0)	9.7 (49.5)	7.6 (45.7)	11.7 (53.0)
Record low °C (°F)	−4.1 (24.6)	−3.8 (25.2)	−1.9 (28.6)	0.1 (32.2)	2.6 (36.7)	5.6 (42.1)	8.8 (47.8)	8.0 (46.4)	5.5 (41.9)	1.4 (34.5)	−1.3 (29.7)	−2.5 (27.5)	−4.1 (24.6)
Average precipitation mm (inches)	122.7 (4.83)	75.0 (2.95)	59.5 (2.34)	79.3 (3.12)	91.7 (3.61)	32.3 (1.27)	13.5 (0.53)	30.6 (1.20)	76.9 (3.03)	133.3 (5.25)	150.6 (5.93)	127.9 (5.04)	993.3 (39.1)
Average precipitation days (≥ 1.0 mm)	10.61	8.68	7.53	9.11	9.46	5.18	2.54	2.92	7.37	11.94	10.74	11.24	97.32
Source 1: Météo Climat 1991–2020 "Moyennes 1991/2020 Sagres". Baseline climate means (1991–2020) from stations all over the world. Météo Climat.
Source 2: Météo Climat 1973–present "Extremes for Porto". Météo Climat.

== Politics and government ==
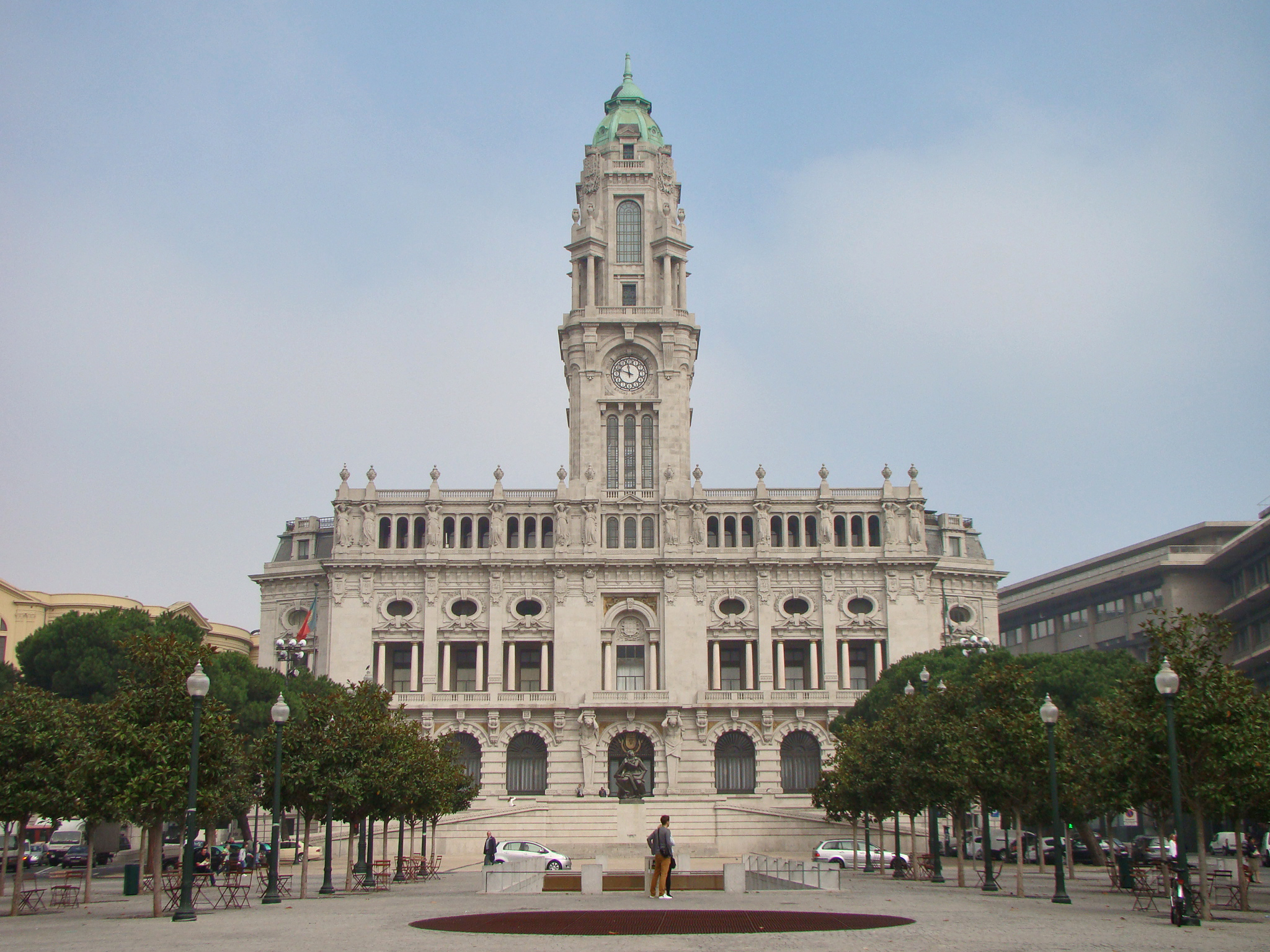
Porto City Hall in the Avenida dos Aliados

Pedro Duarte (PSD) is the current mayor of Porto, having taken office on 5 November 2025, following the 2025 local elections.

=== Local election results 1976–2025 ===
Parties are listed from left-wing to right-wing.

Summary of local elections for Porto city hall, 1976–2025
Election	BE	PCP APU CDU	PS	PRD	PAN	PSD	CDS	PPM	RM FA	CH	O/I	Turnout
1976		13.8	34.7			24.5	20.0				7.6	73.4
1979		16.7	30.7			49.7					4.2	79.3
1982		19.5	34.5			42.6					3.4	73.8
1985		18.1	26.8	7.4		36.1	8.4				3.2	60.8
1989		11.5	41.5	0.7		31.8	10.3	0.7			3.5	54.5
1993		7.2	59.6			25.6	4.8				2.8	58.3
1997		11.3	55.8			26.3		0.5			6.2	48.1
2001	2.6	10.5	38.5			42.8					5.8	48.3
2005	4.2	9.0	36.1			46.2					4.6	58.5
2009	5.0	9.8	34.7			47.5					3.1	56.8
2013	3.6	7.4	22.7			21.1	w.RM		39.3		6.0	52.6
2017	5.3	5.9	28.6		1.9	10.4	w.RM		44.5		3.5	53.7
2021	6.3	7.5	18.0		2.8	17.2	w.RM		40.7	3.0	4.5	48.8
2025	1.8	3.9	35.5		w.FA	37.4			5.1	8.2	8.1	57.0
Source: Marktest

=== Active political parties established in Porto ===
The Portuguese party Iniciativa Liberal (IL), founded and headquartered in Porto, is the only Portuguese party represented in parliament which is headquartered outside the Lisbon area.

== Demographics ==
Largest groups of foreign residents in 2021
Nationality	Population
Brazil	8,307
Italy	1,222
Spain	749
France	688
India	607
China	537
Angola	530
Cape Verde	502

Estimates from 2016 show that the population is 55% female, compared to 45% male. The largest age group, according to 2016 estimates, is 60 to 69, followed by residents in the 50 to 59 demographic. The majority 93.7% of residents were born in Portugal. The city also has residents born in Angola, Brazil, Cape Verde, and countries across Europe.

Religion in the municipality of Porto (Census 2021)
1. Catholicism (74.2%)
2. Orthodoxy (0.26%)
3. Protestantism (2.09%)
4. Jehovah's Witnesses (0.58%)
5. Other Christian (1.95%)
6. Buddhism (0.25%)
7. Hinduism (0.18%)
8. Judaism (0.09%)
9. Islam (0.42%)
10. Other Religion (0.44%)
11. No Religion (19.6%)

=== Census results ===
Historical population
Year	Pop.	±%
1864	89,349	—
1878	110,707	+23.9%
1890	146,454	+32.3%
1900	165,729	+13.2%
1911	191,890	+15.8%
1920	202,310	+5.4%
1930	229,794	+13.6%
1940	258,548	+12.5%
1950	281,406	+8.8%
1960	303,424	+7.8%
1970	301,655	−0.6%
1981	327,368	+8.5%
1991	302,472	−7.6%
2001	263,131	−13.0%
2011	237,591	−9.7%
2021	231,800	−2.4%
2024	273,979	+18.2%
2025	273,476	−0.2%
Source: INE

== Economy ==
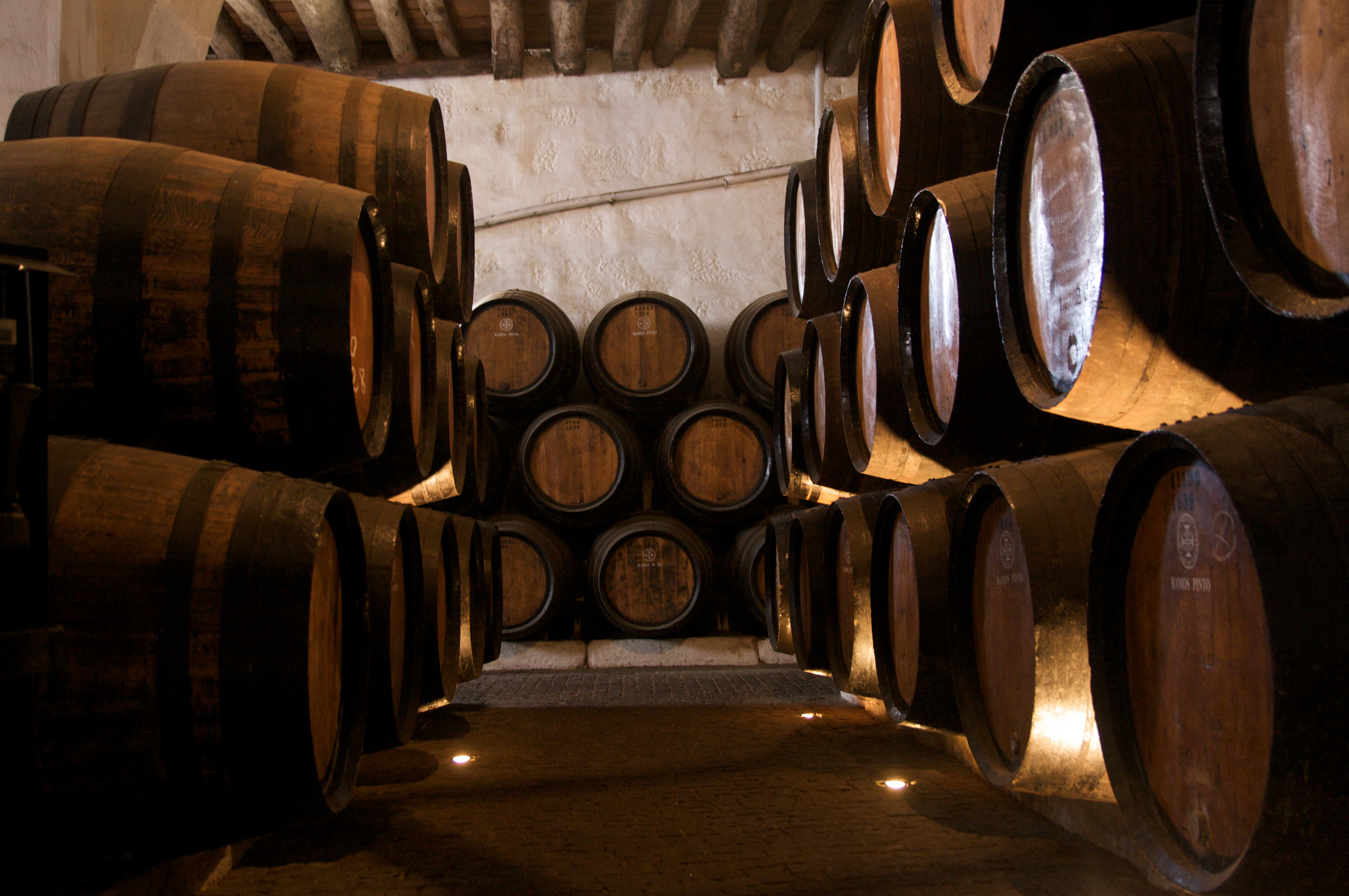
Barrels of port wine aging: the fortified wine is the best-known of the city's exports

Porto and the surrounding conurbation, with the Porto municipality as its core, form one of the principal industrial and financial centers of both Portugal and the Iberian Peninsula. As the most prominent city in the heavily industrialized northwest, Porto hosts the headquarters of numerous leading Portuguese corporations spanning various economic sectors, including Altri, Ambar, Amorim, Bial, BPI, Cerealis, CIN, Cofina, EFACEC, Frulact, Lactogal, Millennium bcp, Porto Editora, RAR, Sonae, Sonae Indústria, ebankIT, and Super Bock Group. Most of these companies are based within the Greater Metropolitan Area of Porto, particularly in the core municipalities of Maia, Matosinhos, Porto, and Vila Nova de Gaia.

The city's former stock exchange (Bolsa do Porto) evolved into Portugal's largest futures exchange before merging with the Lisbon Stock Exchange to create the Bolsa de Valores de Lisboa e Porto. This was later absorbed into the multinational Euronext group, alongside the exchanges of Amsterdam, Brussels, and Paris. The former stock exchange building is now a major tourist attraction, known for its ornate Salão Árabe (Arab Room).

Porto is the headquarters of the Banco Português de Fomento (BPF), a state-owned development bank established in 2020.

Jornal de Notícias, a prominent national newspaper, is based in the city. The building bearing its name was once among Porto's tallest, although it has since been surpassed by newer structures built since the 1990s.

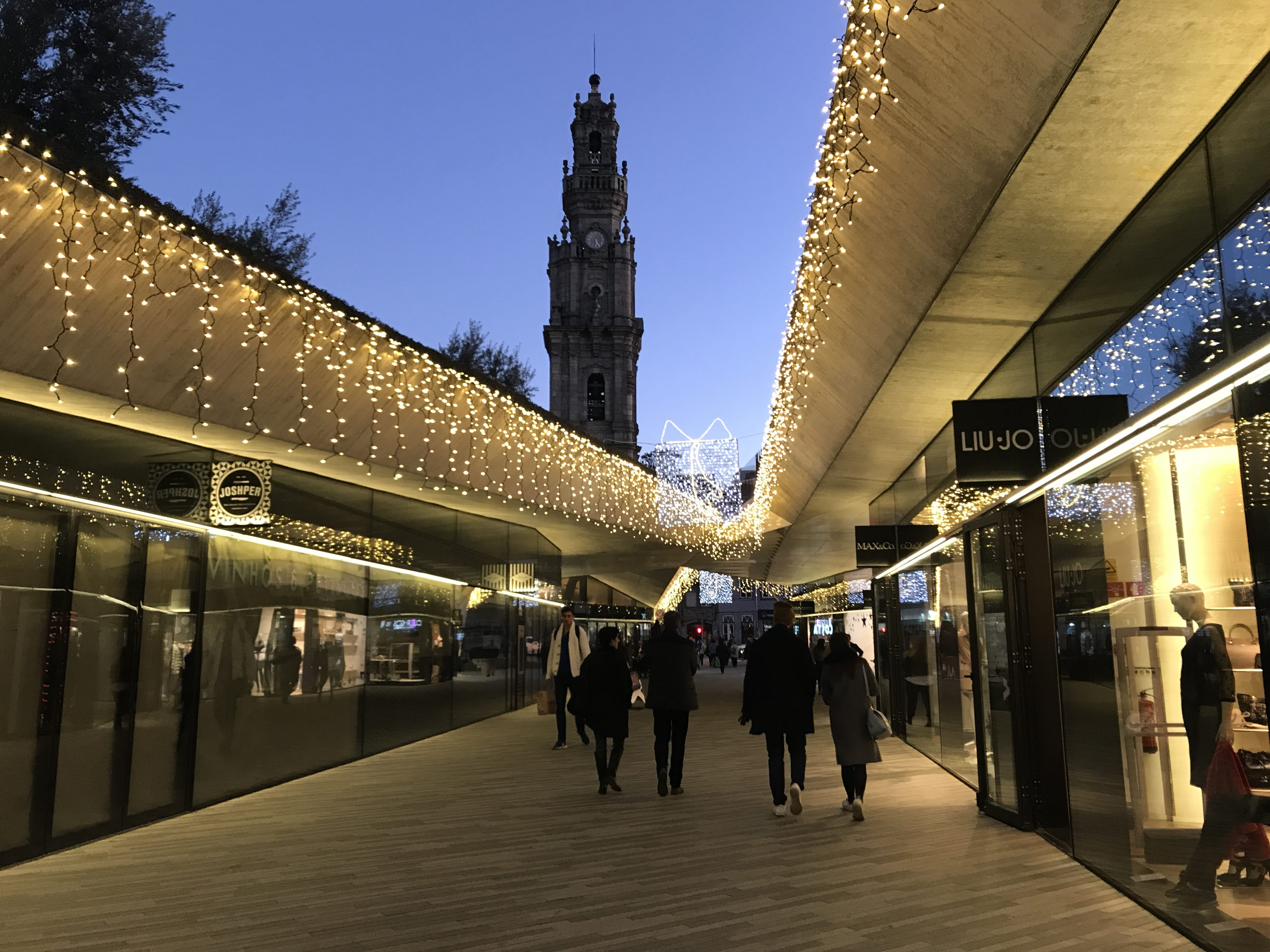
The Passeio dos Clérigos shopping area near the Clérigos Tower

Porto Editora, one of the largest Portuguese publishing houses, is also based in the city. Its dictionaries and translations are among the most widely used in Portugal.

Porto's economic ties to the Upper Douro River region have been documented since the Middle Ages and were further developed in the modern era. Products such as sumac, dried fruits, nuts, and olive oil were historically exported from Porto's riverside quays to markets in the Old and New World. Growth of the Port wine (Vinho do Porto) industry strengthened this interregional relationship. The trade in fortified wines established a complementary dynamic between the coastal urban center and the agriculturally rich Douro Valley. Much of the wine industry's infrastructure developed on the south bank of the Douro, in Vila Nova de Gaia, where the amphitheater-shaped slopes house historic port wine cellars.

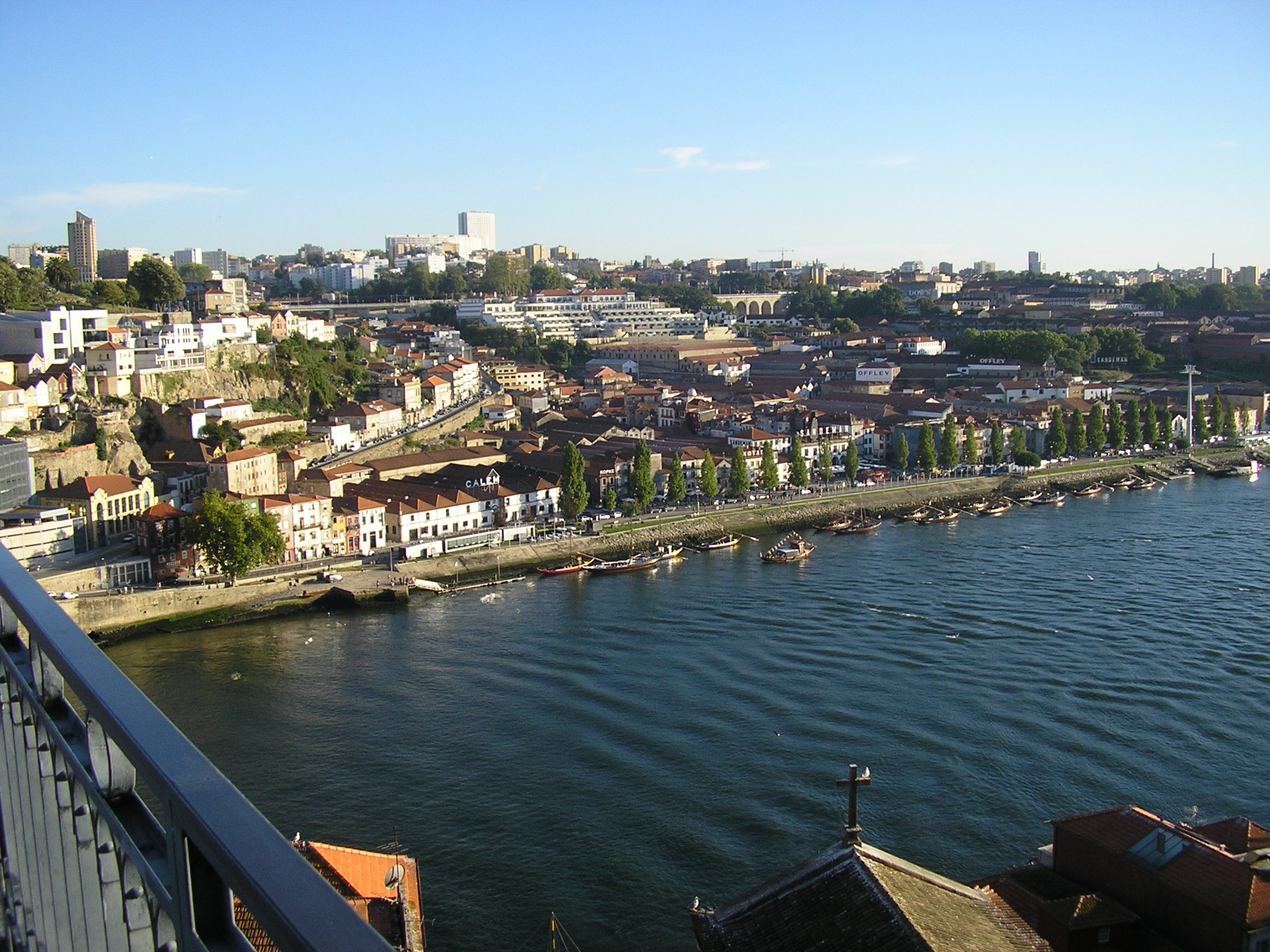
South side of the Douro River: Vila Nova de Gaia

Porto is a gateway to northern Portugal and to northern and western Spain. Within a two-hour drive of Francisco de Sá Carneiro Airport, travelers can access four UNESCO World Heritage Sites and popular Spanish destinations such as Santiago de Compostela.

In a 2006 study on the competitiveness of Portugal's 18 district capitals, conducted by researchers from the University of Minho and published in Público, Porto was ranked lowest. The validity of the ranking was questioned by local leaders and business figures, who argued that Porto functions as part of a larger conurbation and cannot be evaluated in isolation.

A 2007 survey published by Expresso ranked Porto as the third-best city to live in Portugal, tied with Évora and behind Guimarães and Lisbon.

The Porto metropolitan area had a GDP of €47.0 billion (US$50.8 billion) in 2024, with a per capita GDP of €25,942 (US$28,072).

== Tourism ==
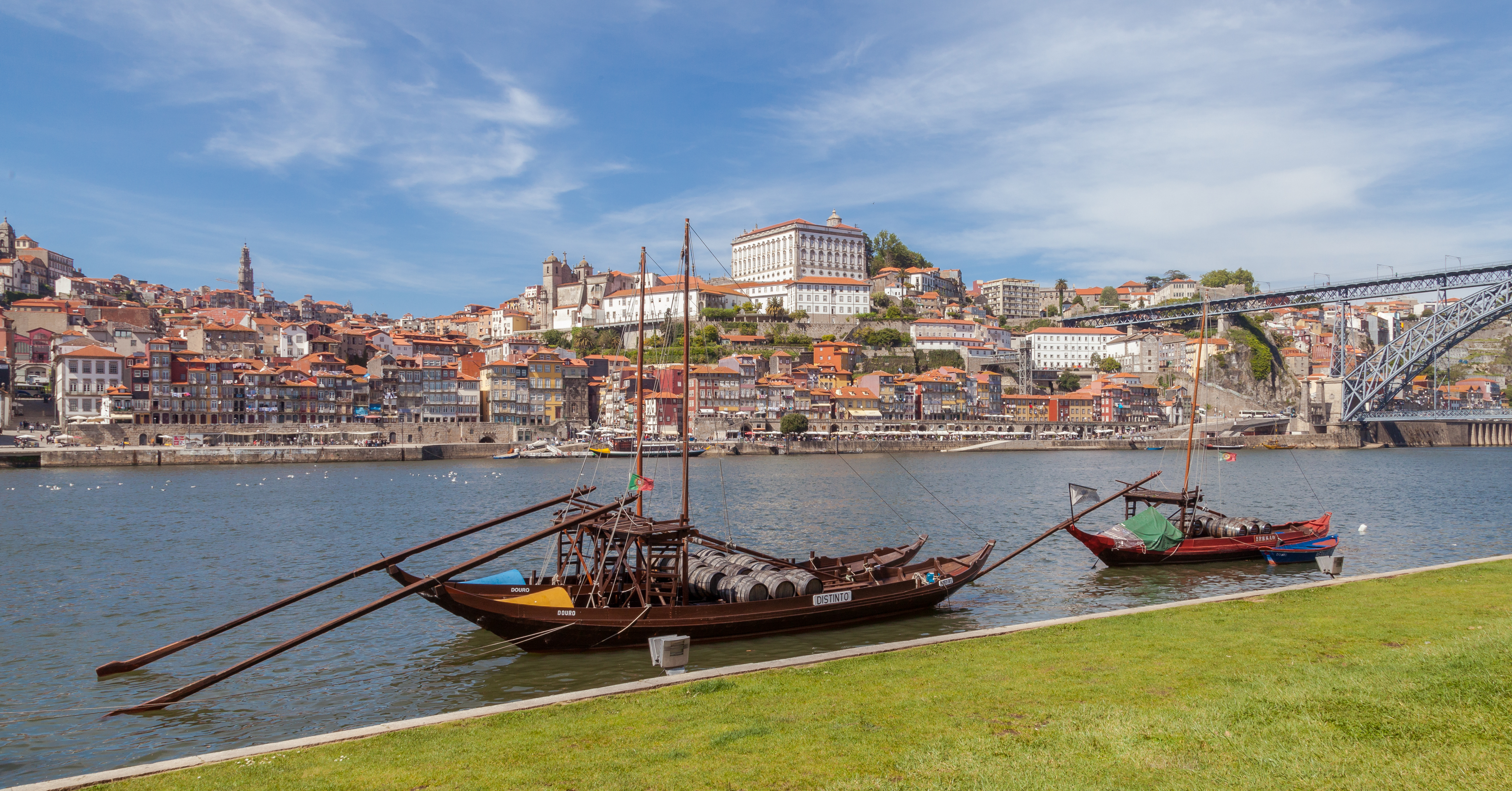
The Ribeira area along the Douro River, part of the UNESCO World Heritage Site

In recent years, Porto has experienced a significant rise in tourism, aided in part by the establishment of a Ryanair hub at Francisco de Sá Carneiro Airport. Between January and November 2017, the city received 2.8 million overnight visitors and 1.4 million day-trippers, 73 percent of whom were international tourists. Tourism revenues increased by over 11 percent during that period, according to a 2018 report. More than 3 million tourists visited the city during 2025.

A 2019 report noted that over 10 percent of Porto's economic activity is generated by tourism. The hotel occupancy rate in 2017 was 77%.

According to a 2019 scholarly study, "Porto is one of the fastest-growing European tourist destinations that has experienced exponential growth in the demand for city-break tourists".

Notable attractions include the Porto Cathedral, Dom Luís I Bridge, Café Majestic, Livraria Lello, and the gardens of Palácio de Cristal.

== Transport ==
=== Roads and bridges ===
Internal highway

The Via de Cintura Interna, or A20, is an internal highway connected to several motorways and city exits. The Circunvalação is a 4-lane peripheric road bordering the north of the city and connecting the eastern side of the city to the Atlantic shore. The city is connected to Valença (Viana do Castelo) by highway A28, to Estarreja (Aveiro) by the A29, to Lisbon by the A1, to Bragança by the A4 and to Braga by the A3. There is an outer-ring road, the A41, that connects the main cities around Porto, linking the city to other major metropolitan highways such as the A7, A11, A42, A43 and A44. In 2011, a new highway, the A32, was completed to connect the metropolitan area to São João da Madeira and Oliveira de Azeméis.

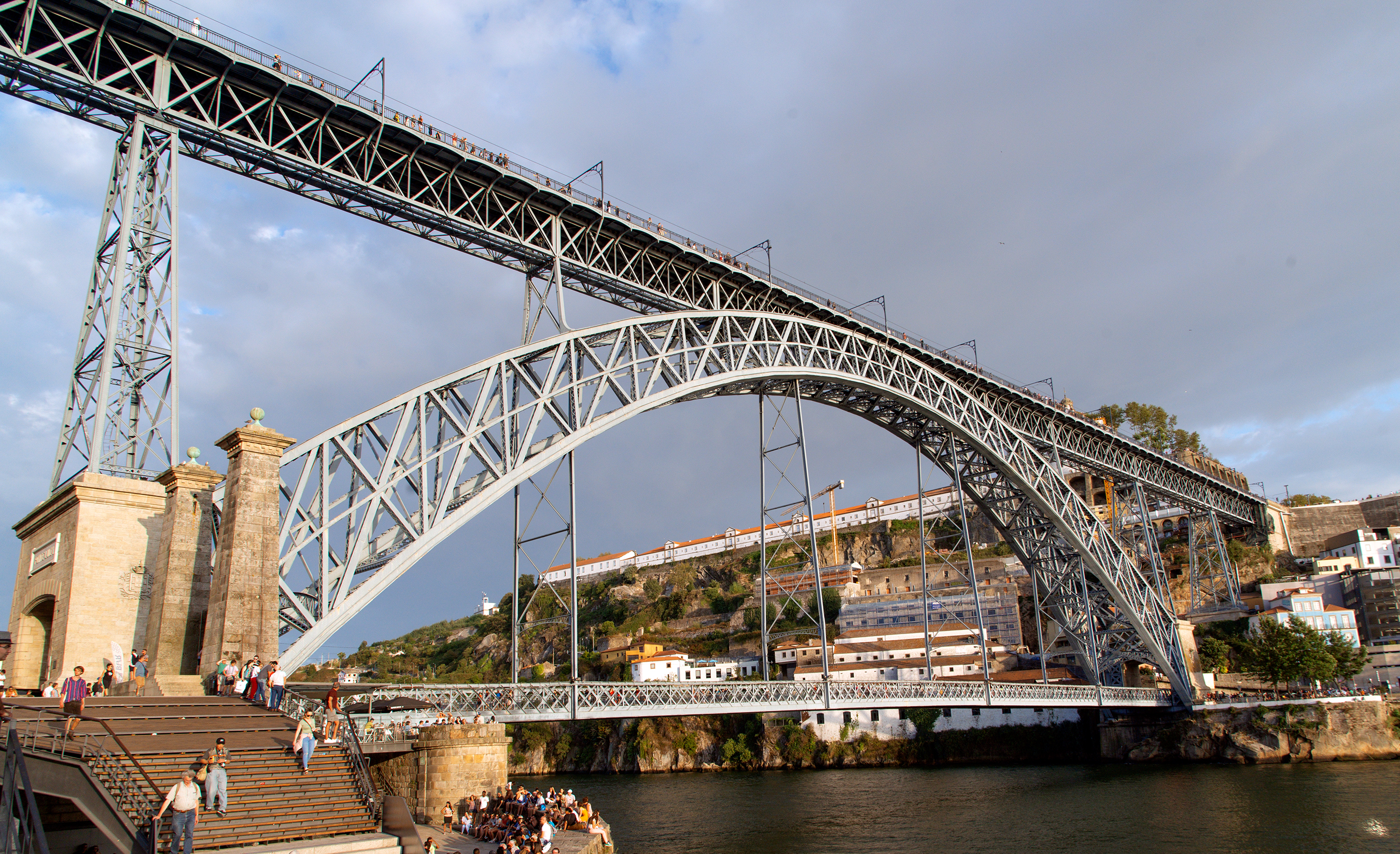
Luís I Bridge, September 2019

The Dom Luís I Bridge (Ponte de Dom Luís I) is a double-deck metal arch bridge that spans the River Douro between Porto and Vila Nova de Gaia. Built in 1886, its 172 metres (564 ft) span was then the longest of its type in the world. The top-level is used by pedestrians and the Porto Metro trains, while the lower level carries traffic and pedestrians.

During the 20th century, major bridges were built: Arrábida Bridge, which at its opening had the biggest concrete supporting arch in the world, and connects the north and south shores of the Douro on the west side of the city, S. João, to replace D. Maria Pia and Freixo, a highway bridge on the east side of the city. The newest bridge is Infante Dom Henrique Bridge, finished in 2003.

Porto is often referred to as Cidade das Pontes (City of the Bridges), besides its more traditional nicknames of "Cidade Invicta" (Unconquered or Invincible City) and "Capital do Norte" (Capital of the North).

=== Cruising ===
In July 2015 a new cruise terminal was opened at the port of Leixões, north of the city in Matosinhos.

=== Airport ===
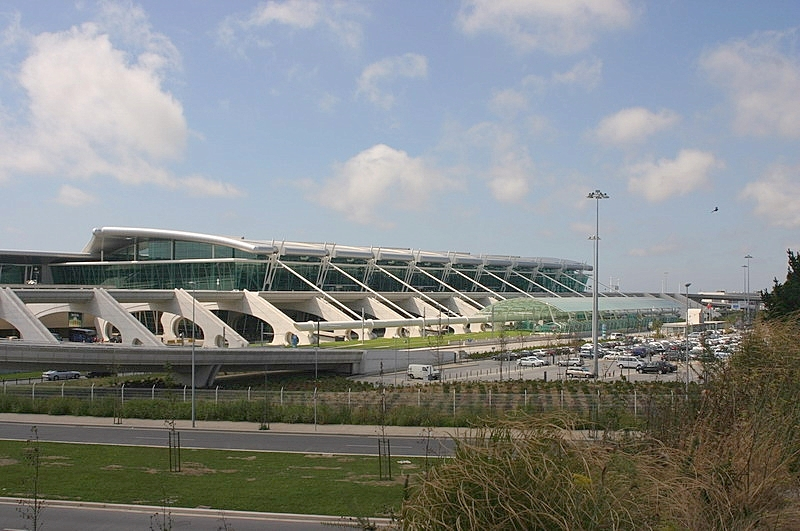
Francisco Sá Carneiro Airport

Porto is served by Francisco de Sá Carneiro Airport in Pedras Rubras, Moreira da Maia civil parish of the neighbouring Municipality of Maia, 15 kilometres (9 miles) to the north-west of the city center. The airport underwent a massive program of refurbishment due to the Euro 2004 football championships being partly hosted in the city. It is connected to central Porto by metro's line E. By 2025, the airport served nearly 17 million passengers, being the second busiest airport in Portugal and the 40th busiest in Europe.

=== Public transport ===
==== Railways ====
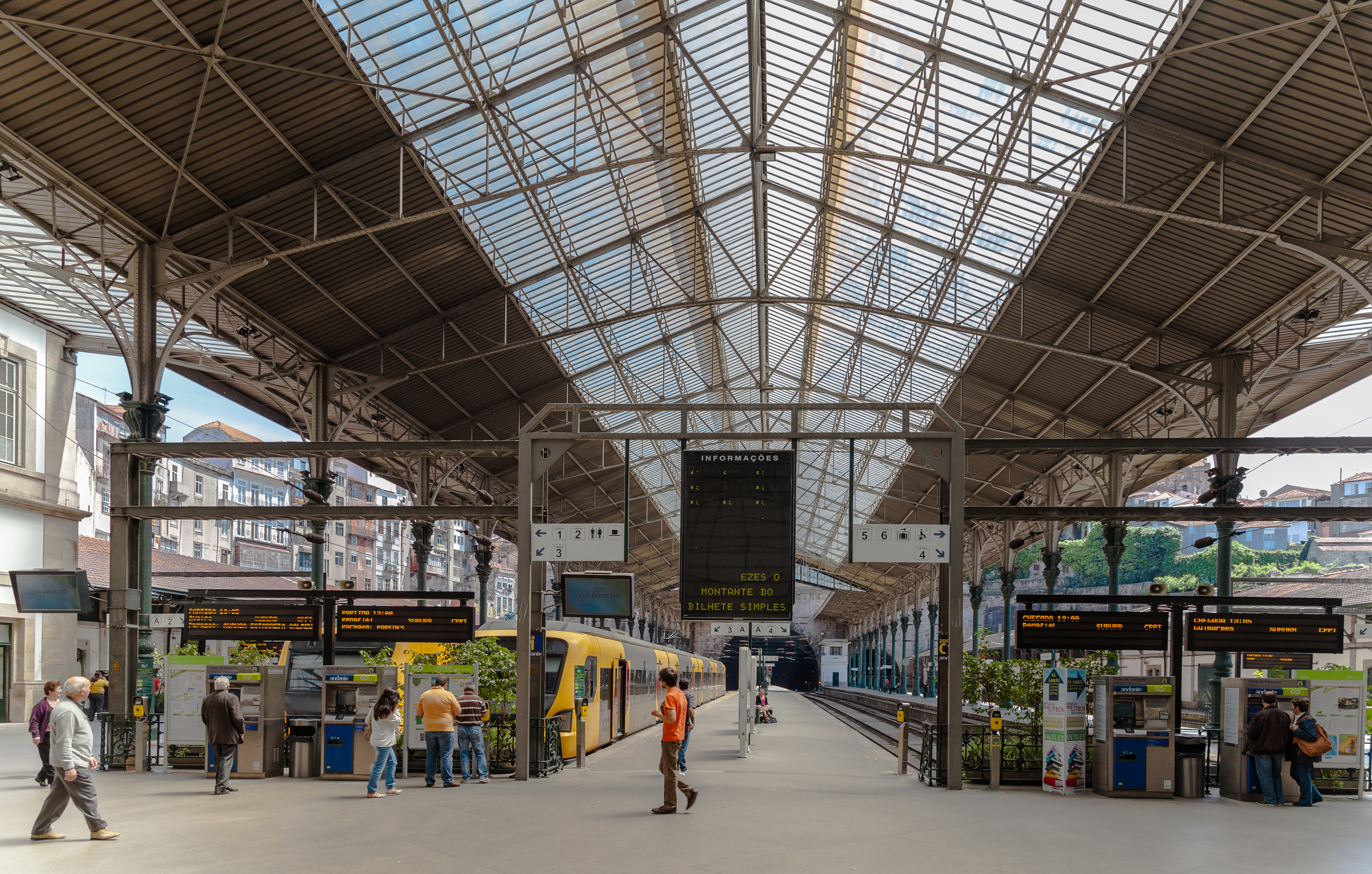
São Bento railway station

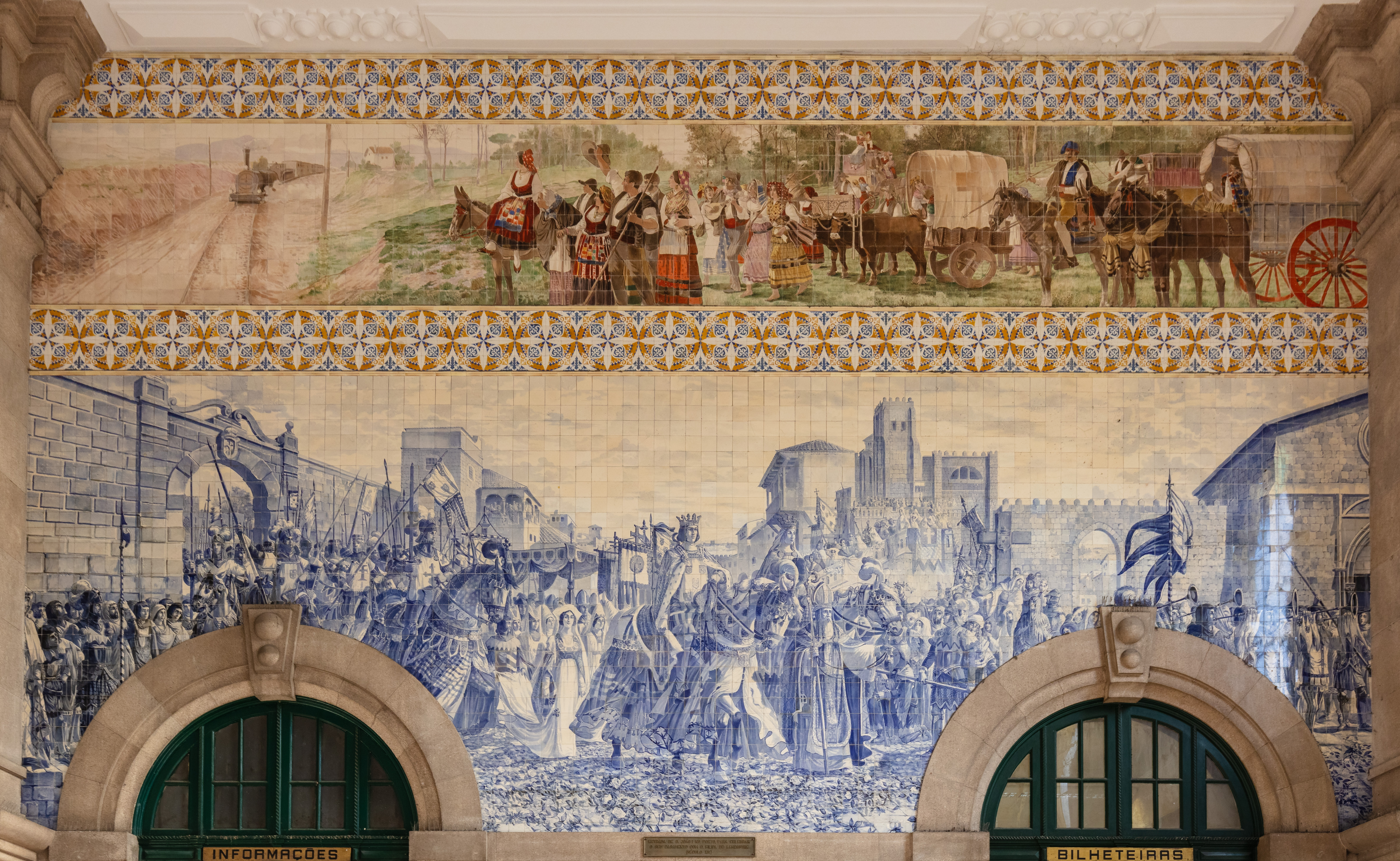
Azulejos at São Bento

Porto's main railway station is Campanhã railway station, in the eastern part of the city and connected to the lines of Douro (Peso da Régua/Tua/Pocinho), Minho (Barcelos/Viana do Castelo/Valença) and the center of Portugal (on the main line to Aveiro, Coimbra and Lisbon).

From Campanhã station, both light rail and suburban rail services connect to the city center. The main central station is São Bento Station, a notable landmark in the heart of Porto. This station was built between 1900 and 1916, based on plans by architect José Marques da Silva. The large panels of azulejo tile were designed by Jorge Colaço; the murals represent moments in the country's history and rural scenes showing the people of various regions.

Porto is connected with Lisbon via high-speed trains, Alfa Pendular, that cover the distance in 2h 42min. The intercities take slightly more than three hours to cover the distance. Porto is connected to the Spanish city of Vigo with the Celta train, running twice every day, a 2h 20min trip.

==== Light rail ====
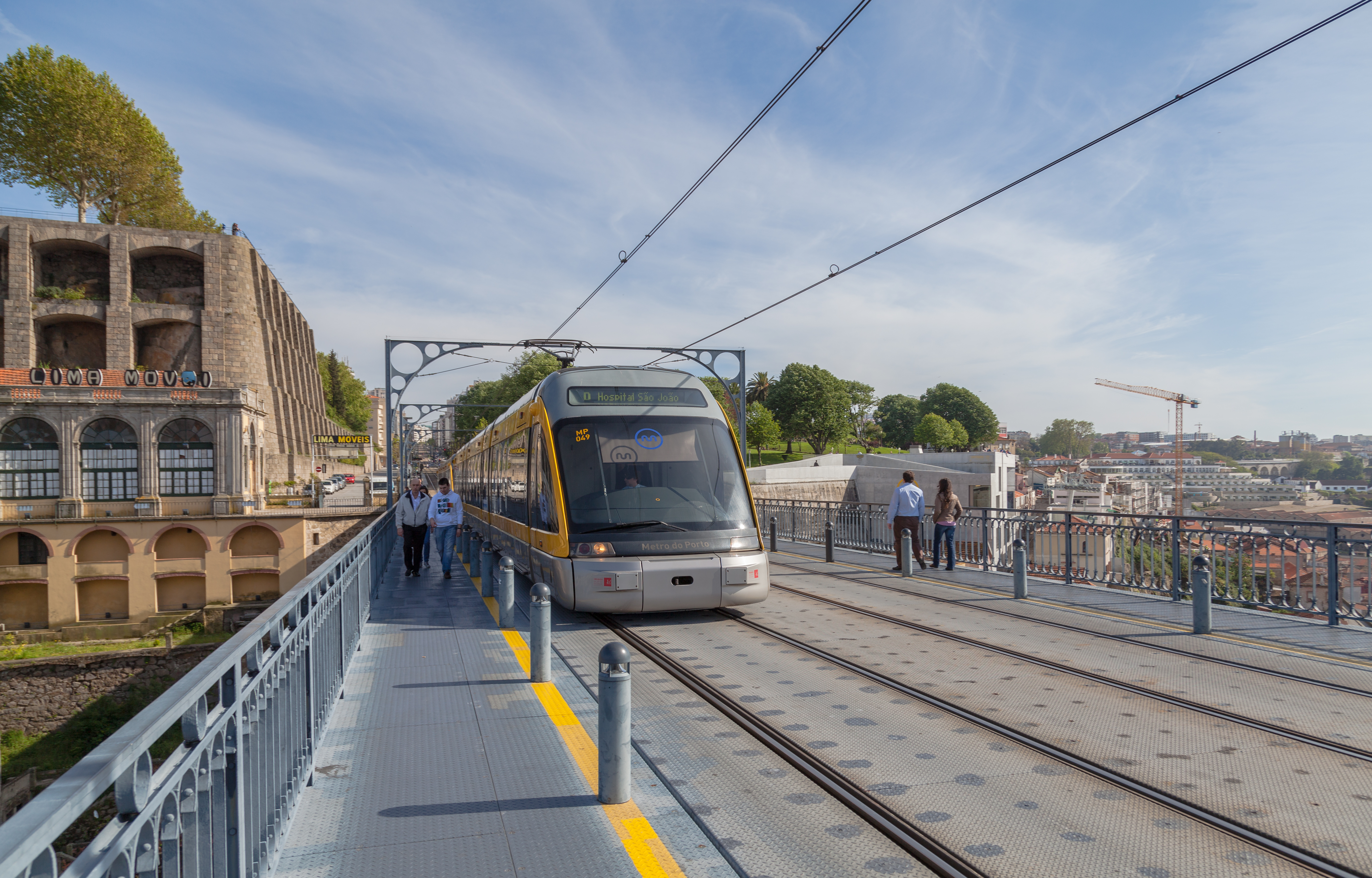
Porto Metro light rail

The major network is the Porto Metro, a light rail system. Consequently, the Infante bridge was built for urban traffic, replacing the Dom Luís I, which was dedicated to the light rail on the second and higher of the bridge's two levels. Six lines are open:

- Lines A (blue), B (red), C (green) and E (purple) all begin at Estádio do Dragão (home to FC Porto) and end at Senhor de Matosinhos, Póvoa de Varzim (via Vila do Conde), ISMAI (via Maia) and Francisco Sá Carneiro airport respectively.
- Line D (yellow) runs from Hospital S. João in the north to Vila d'Este on the southern side of the Douro river.
- Line F (orange) runs from Senhora da Hora (Matosinhos) to Fânzeres (Gondomar).

The lines intersect at the central Trindade station. The whole network covers 70 km (43 mi) with 85 stations, and is the biggest urban rail transit system in the country.

In 2019, Porto Metro transferred the management of the Funicular dos Guindais to Porto city hall. Expansion of the network is underway, with two lines under construction.

Metro do Porto
Line	Length (km)	Stations	Inauguration	Vehicle
Estádio do Dragão ↔ Senhor de Matosinhos	15.6	23	7 December 2002	Flexity Outlook (Eurotram)
Estádio do Dragão ↔ Póvoa de Varzim	33.6	35	13 March 2005	Flexity Swift (Tram-train)
Campanhã ↔ ISMAI	19.6	24	30 July 2005	Flexity Swift (Tram-train)
Hospital São João ↔ Vila D'Este	9.2	16	18 September 2005	Flexity Outlook (Eurotram)
Estádio do Dragão ↔ Aeroporto	16.7	21	27 May 2006	Flexity Outlook (Eurotram)
Fânzeres ↔ Senhora da Hora	17.4	24	2 January 2011	Flexity Outlook (Eurotram)

==== Buses ====
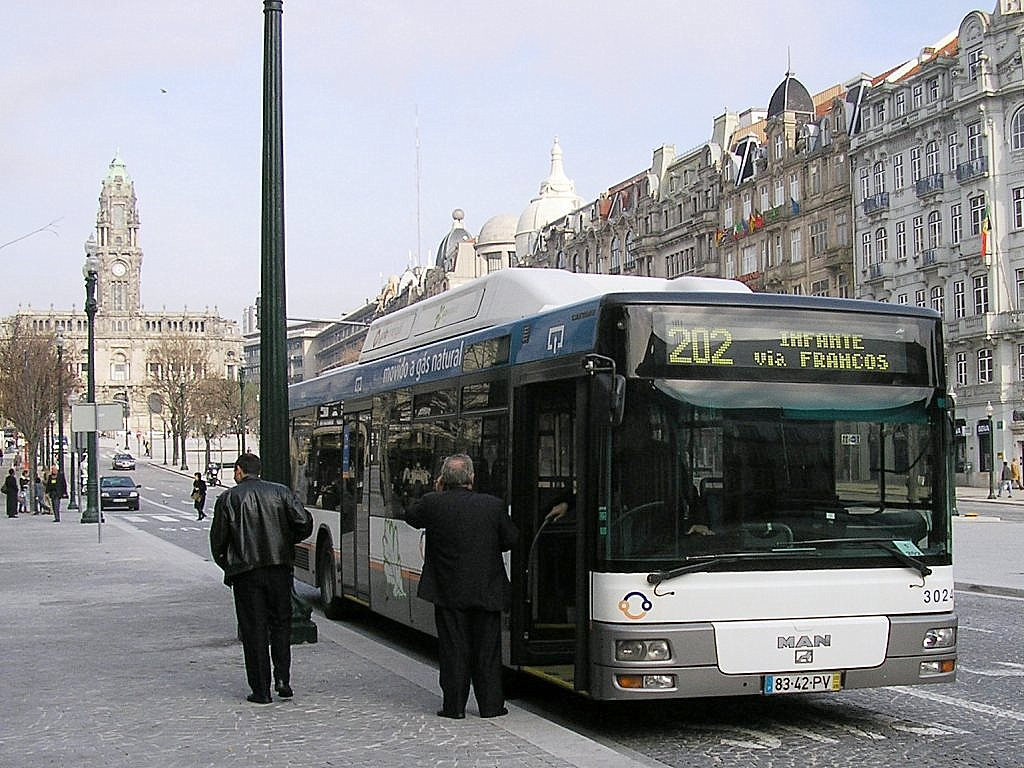
STCP bus

The city has an extensive bus network run by the STCP (Sociedade dos Transportes Colectivos do Porto, or Porto Public transport Society) which also operates lines in the neighbouring cities of Gaia, Maia, Matosinhos, Gondomar and Valongo. Other smaller companies connect towns such as Paços de Ferreira and Santo Tirso to the town center. There is also a metropolitan bus service named UNIR that started in December of 2023. In the past, the city also had trolleybuses. A bus journey is €2.50, which must be paid in cash. Since February 2026, a Bus rapid transit, managed by Porto Metro, has also been operating.

==== Trams ====
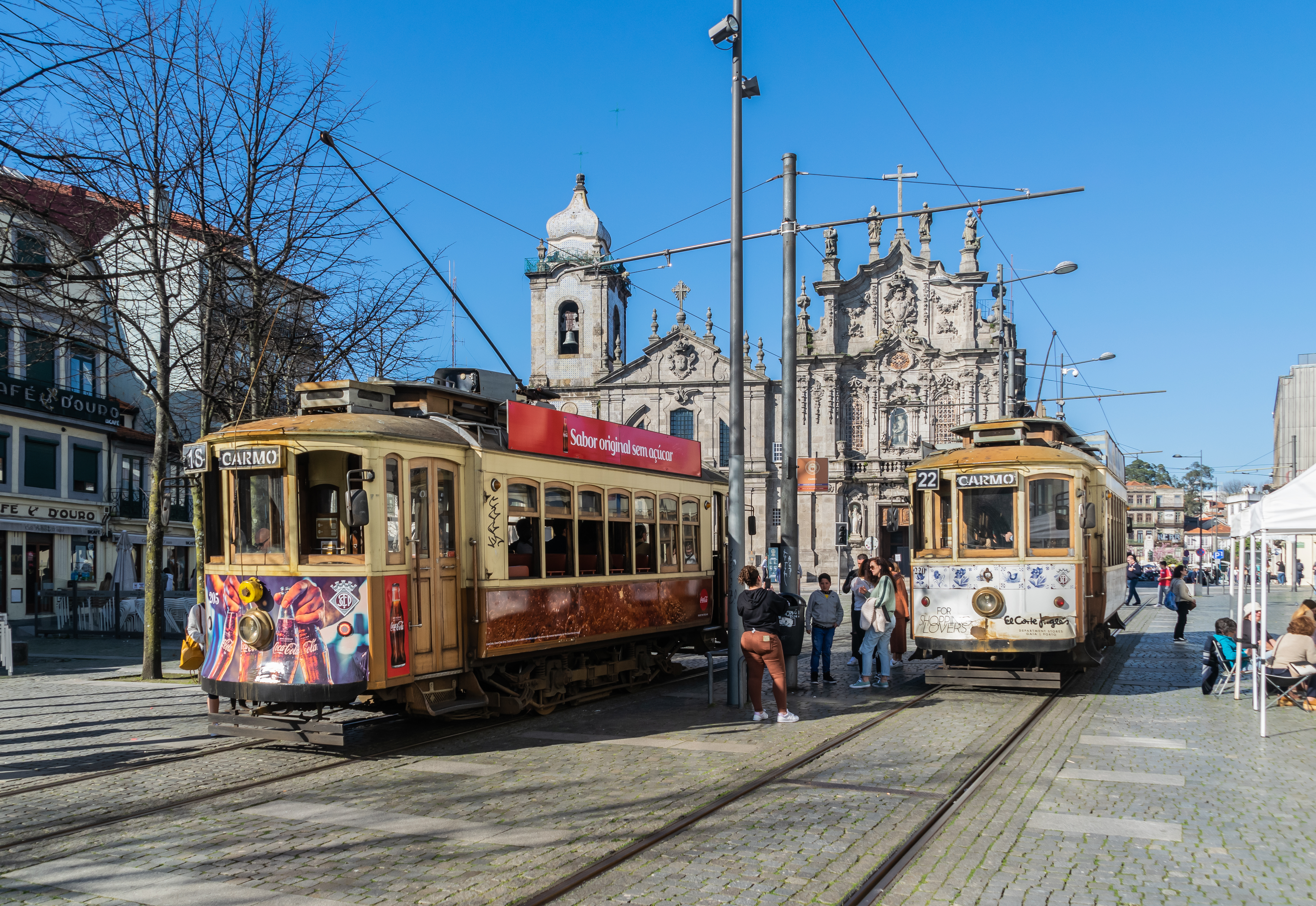
Heritage tram

Construction of a tram network began in 1895, the first in the Iberian Peninsula. Only three lines remain, including a tourist line on the shores of the Douro. The lines in operation all use vintage tramcars, so the service has become a heritage tramway. STCP operates these routes as well as a tram museum. The first line of the area's modern-tram, or light rail system, Metro do Porto, opened for revenue service in January 2003, after a brief period of free, introductory service in December 2002.

==== Porto public transportation statistics ====
The average amount of time people spend commuting with public transit in Porto, for example to and from work, on a weekday is 47 minutes. About 6.5% of public transit riders ride for more than two hours every day. The average time people wait at a stop or station for public transit is 12 minutes, while 17.4% of riders wait for over 20 minutes on average every day. The average distance people ride in a single trip with public transit is 6 km (4 miles), while 5% travel for over 12 km (8 miles) in a single direction.

== Culture ==
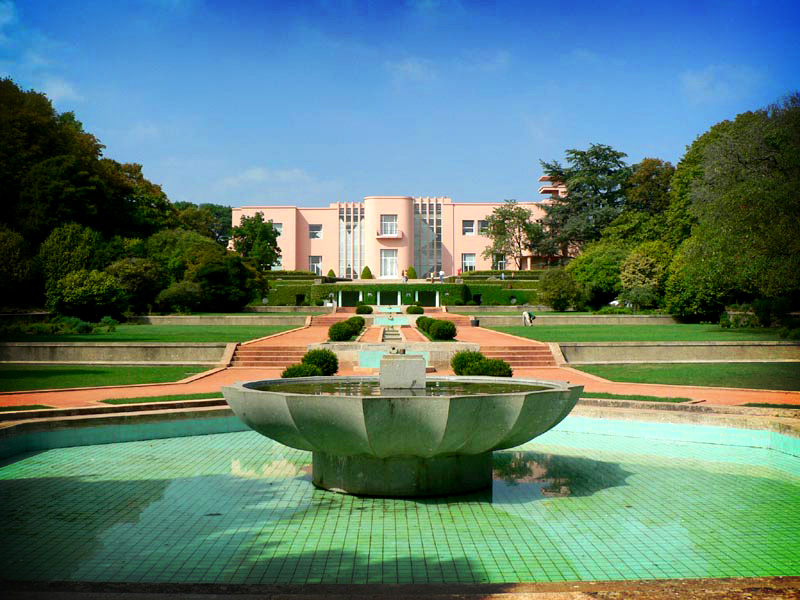
Casa de Serralves

In 2001, Porto shared the designation European Culture Capital with Rotterdam. As part of this, construction of the major concert hall space Casa da Música, designed by the Dutch architect Rem Koolhaas, was started, finishing in 2005.

The first Portuguese moving pictures were taken in Porto by Aurélio da Paz dos Reis and shown there on 12 November 1896 in the Teatro do Príncipe Real do Porto, less than a year after the first public presentation by Auguste and Louis Lumière. The country's first movie studios Invicta Filmes was also erected in Porto in 1917 and was open from 1918 to 1927 in the area of Carvalhido. Manoel de Oliveira, a Portuguese film director and the oldest director in the world to be active until his death in 2015, was from Porto. Fantasporto is an international film festival organized in Porto every year. The DCEU film The Suicide Squad (2021) was set in and partly filmed in the city.

Many Portuguese music artists and cult bands such as GNR, Rui Veloso, Sérgio Godinho, Clã, Pluto, Azeitonas and Ornatos Violeta are from the city or its metropolitan area.

Porto has several museums, concert halls, theaters, cinemas, art galleries, libraries and bookshops. The best-known museums of Porto are the National Museum Soares dos Reis (Museu Nacional de Soares dos Reis), which is dedicated especially to the Portuguese artistic movements from the 16th to the 20th century, and the Museum of Contemporary Art of the Serralves Foundation (Museu de Arte Contemporânea).

The city has concert halls such as the Coliseu do Porto by the Portuguese architect Cassiano Branco, an example of the Portuguese decorative arts. Other venues include the historical São João National Theatre, the Rivoli theatre, the Batalha cinema and Casa da Música, inaugurated in 2005. The city's Lello Bookshop is frequently rated among the top bookstores in the world.

Porto houses the largest synagogue in the Iberian Peninsula and one of the largest in Europe – Kadoorie Synagogue, inaugurated in 1938.

=== Entertainment ===
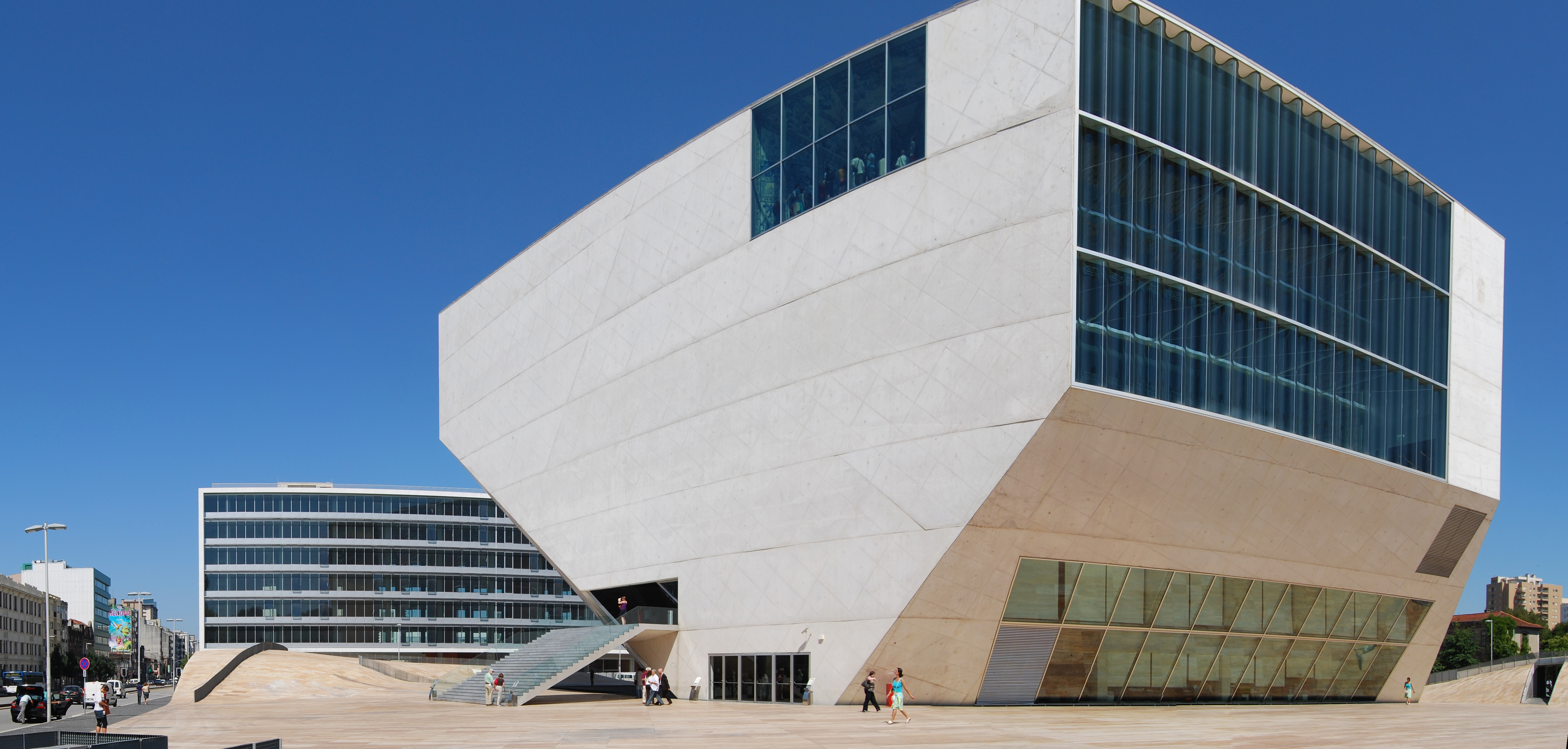
Casa da Música

Porto's most popular event is the street festival of St. John (São João Festival) on the night of 23–24 June. Another major event is Queima das Fitas, which starts on the first Sunday of May and ends on the second Sunday of the month. The week has twelve major events, starting with the Monumental Serenata on Sunday, and reaching its peak with the Cortejo Académico on Tuesday, when about 50,000 students of the city's higher education institutions march through the downtown streets till they reach the city hall. During every night of the week, a series of concerts takes place on the Queimódromo, next to the city's park, where it is also a tradition for the students in their second-to-last year to erect small tents where alcohol is sold to finance the trip that takes place during the last year of their course of study; an average of 50,000 students attend these events.

=== Arts ===
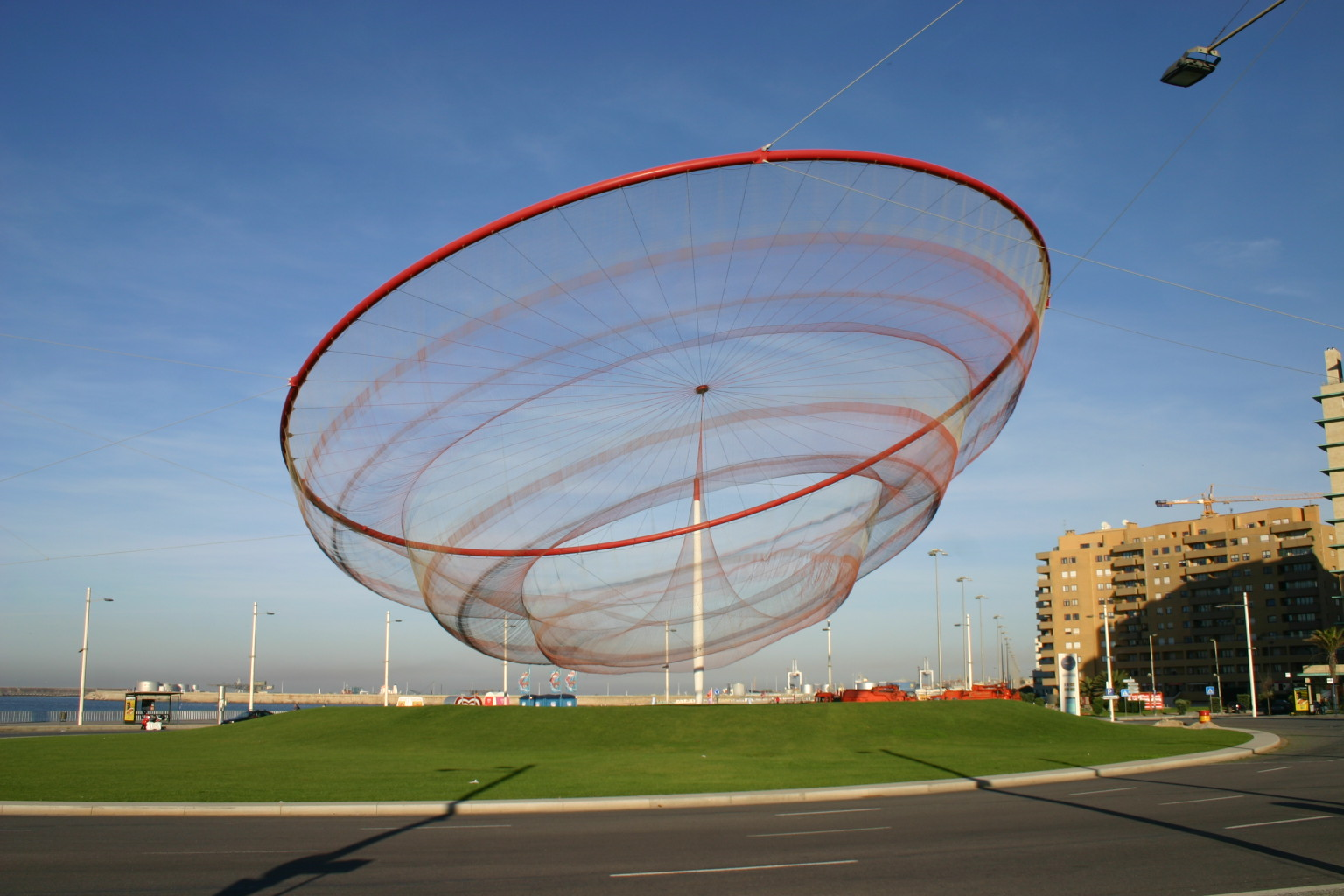
On the waterfront, She Changes sculpture by artist Janet Echelman

Porto was the birthplace in 1856 of Susanna Roope Dockery, an Anglo-Portuguese watercolor painter who produced many paintings of the city and the people and landscape of the surrounding rural areas. An Englishman, Frederick William Flower, moved to Porto in 1834 at the age of 19 to work in the wine trade and subsequently became a pioneer of photography in Portugal. Like Dockery, he drew his inspiration from the city, the Douro river and the rural areas.

In 2005, the municipality funded a public sculpture to be built in the Waterfront Plaza of Matosinhos. The resulting sculpture is entitled She Changes by American artist, Janet Echelman, and spans the height of 50 × 150 × 150 metres.

The city's fine arts school, Faculdade de Belas-Artes da Universidade do Porto, has its origins in a drawing class established in 1780 by Queen Mary I, eventually becoming Academia Portuense de Belas Artes in 1836 and Escola de Belas Artes in 1911. It became part of the University of Porto in 1992 Notable alumni include António Soares dos Reis, António Silva Porto, Aurélia de Souza, and Henrique Pousão.

In the field of dance, Porto was also home to the Spanish-born ballet dancer and choreographer Pirmin Treku who settled in the city in the 1970s and later founded the Pirmin Treku Classical Dance School (Academia de Bailado Clássico Pirmin Treku). His school became one of Porto’s notable training centers for classical ballet, contributing to the development of several generations of Portuguese dancers.

=== Architecture ===
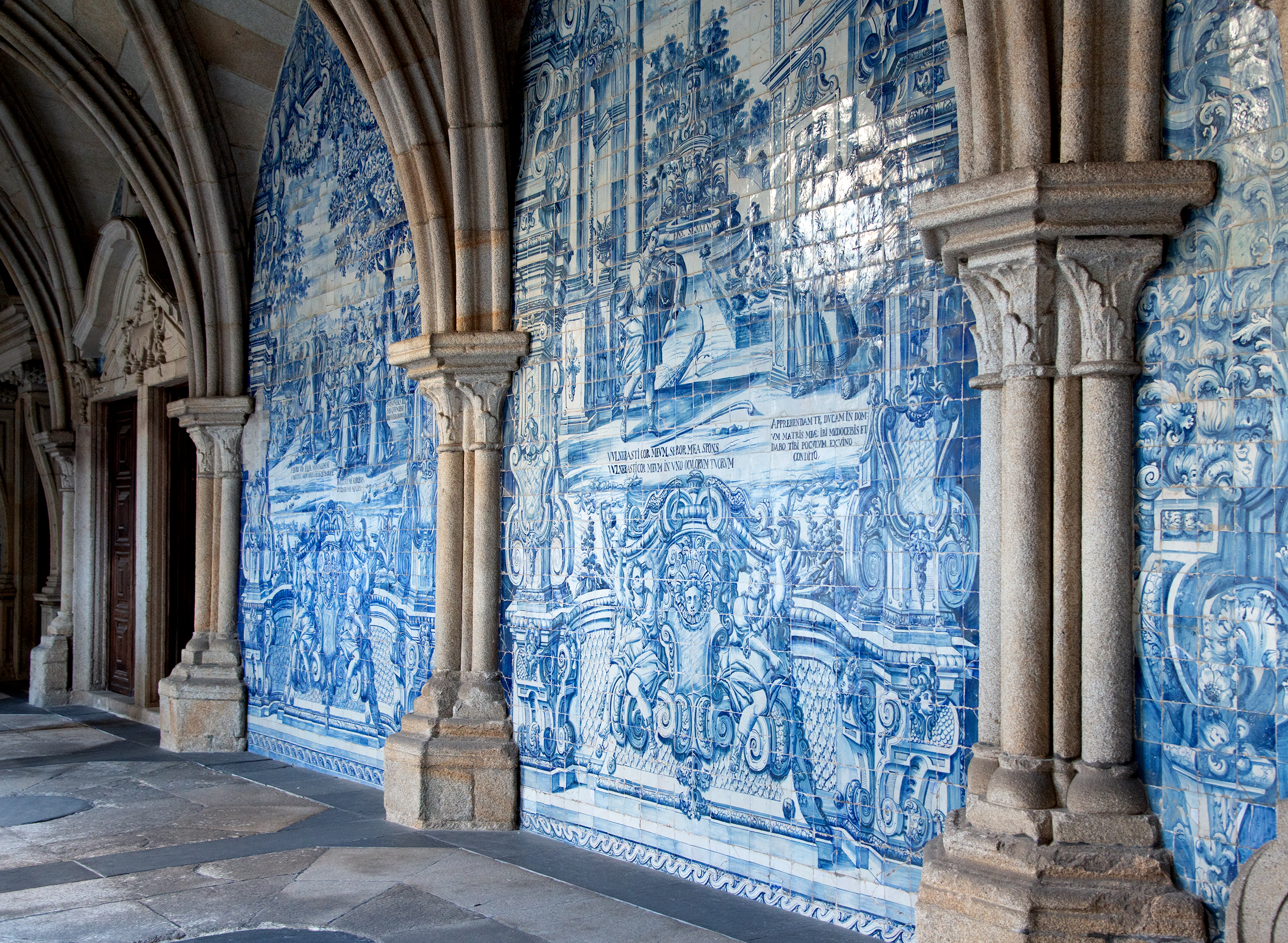
Azulejos and Gothic elements at the Cathedral

Porto is home to the Porto School of Architecture. Two of the winners of the Pritzker Architecture Prize work in the city: Álvaro Siza Vieira and Eduardo Souto de Moura.

The historic area includes the cathedral with its Romanesque choir, the neoclassical Stock Exchange and the Manueline-style Church of Santa Clara. The entire historic center has been a National Monument since 2001 under Law No. 107/2001. The "Historic Centre of Porto, Luiz I Bridge and Monastery of Serra do Pilar" is a UNESCO World Heritage site.

=== Gastronomy ===
The francesinha is made of bread, sausage, steak, cheese and a beer-based sauce. Some types of francesinha may include egg or other ingredients.

A number of dishes from traditional Portuguese cuisine come from the city. A typical dish is Tripas à Moda do Porto (Tripe Porto style). Bacalhau à Gomes de Sá (cod in the style of Gomes de Sá) is another typical codfish dish from Porto.

Francesinha is the most popular native snack food in Porto. It is a kind of sandwich with several types of meat covered with cheese and a sauce made with beer and other ingredients.

Rojões (fried pork meat) and sarrabulho (a pig blood-based dish) are typical dishes of Norte Region which are popular in the regional capital, the city of Porto. As in almost all coastal areas of the Portuguese littoral where fresh fish are available, sardinha assada (grilled sardine) is also a usual dish.

Port wine is widely accepted as the city's dessert wine, especially as the wine is made along the Douro River, which runs through the city.

== Education ==
The city has a large number of public and private elementary and secondary schools, as well as kindergartens and nurseries. The oldest and largest international school located in Porto is the Oporto British School, established in 1894. There are more international schools in the city, such as the French School, the Deutsche Schule zu Porto, and the Oporto International School, which were created in the 20th century.

=== Higher education ===
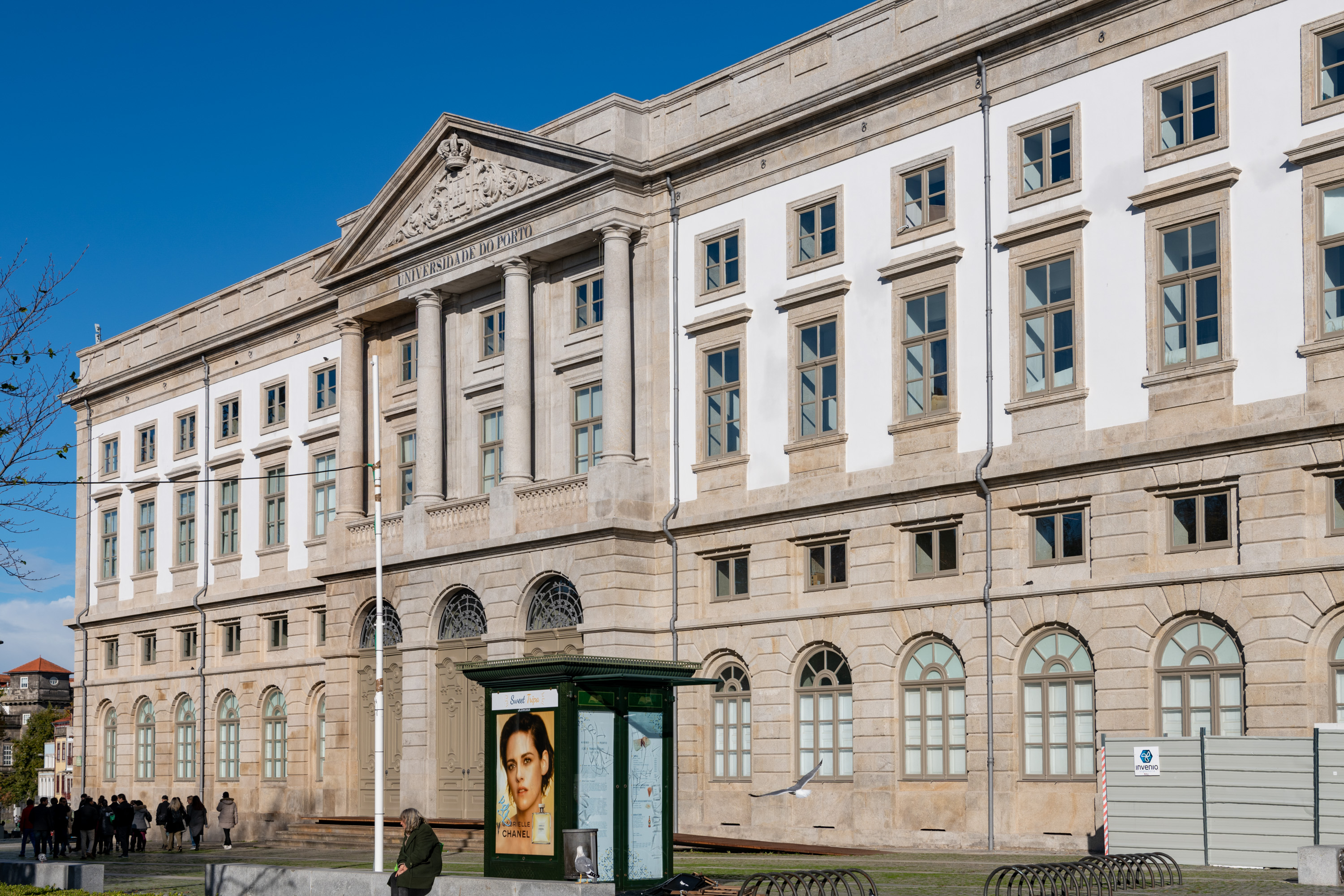
The rectory of the University of Porto

Porto is a major center of higher education in Portugal and is home to two public universities: the University of Porto (Universidade do Porto), a comprehensive research university, and the Technical University of Porto (Universidade Técnica do Porto), with an academic profile rooted in technical and applied education, engineering, technology and professional training. The city also hosts private higher education institutions, including the Lusíada University of Porto, Fernando Pessoa University, the Portuguese Catholic University's Porto campus, the Portucalense University and the Escola Superior Artística do Porto.

== Sport ==
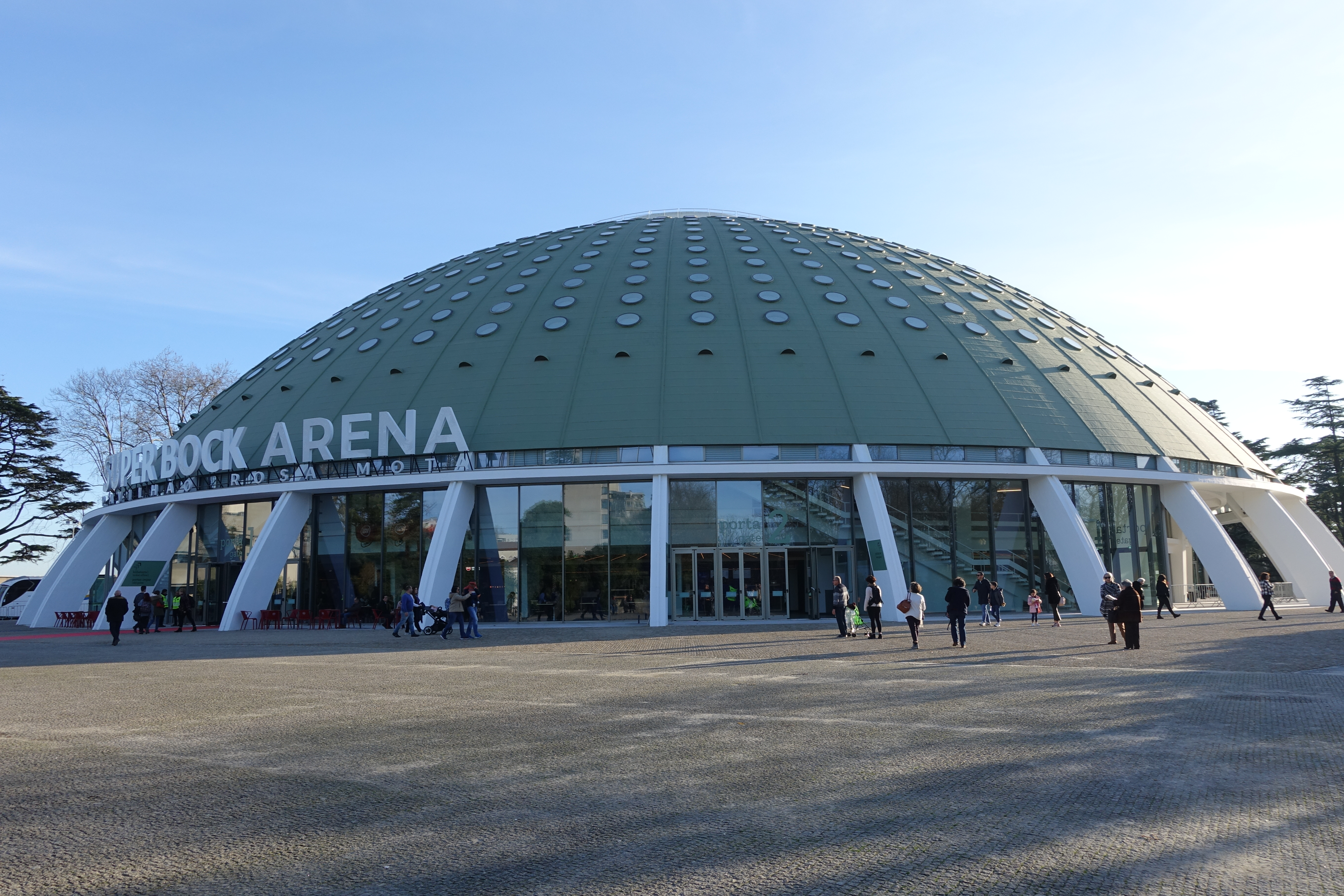
Super Bock Arena – Pavilhão Rosa Mota

There are many sports facilities, most notably the city-owned Super Bock Arena (formerly Pavilhão Rosa Mota), swimming pools in the area of Constituição (between the Marquês and Boavista), and other minor arenas, such as the Pavilhão do Académico. Sports played include handball, basketball, futsal and field hockey, rink hockey, volleyball, water polo and rugby.

Porto is home to northern Portugal's only cricket club, the Oporto Cricket and Lawn Tennis Club. Annually, for more than 100 years, a match (the Kendall Cup) has been played between the Oporto Club and the Casuals Club of Lisbon, in addition to regular games against touring teams (mainly from England). The club's pitch is off the Rua Campo Alegre.

In 1958 and 1960, Porto's streets hosted the Formula One Portuguese Grand Prix on the Boavista street circuit. This is re-enacted annually, in addition to a World Touring Car Championship race.

It is one of the potential host cities for the 2030 FIFA World Cup.

Every year in October the Porto Marathon is held through the streets of the old city of Porto.

In 2023 HC Porto became the first Portuguese ice hockey team to join the Spanish Liga Nacional de Hockey Hielo (LNHH) after an agreement was made between the Portuguese Winter Sports Federation, Royal Spanish Winter Sports Federation and the International Ice Hockey Federation.

=== Football ===
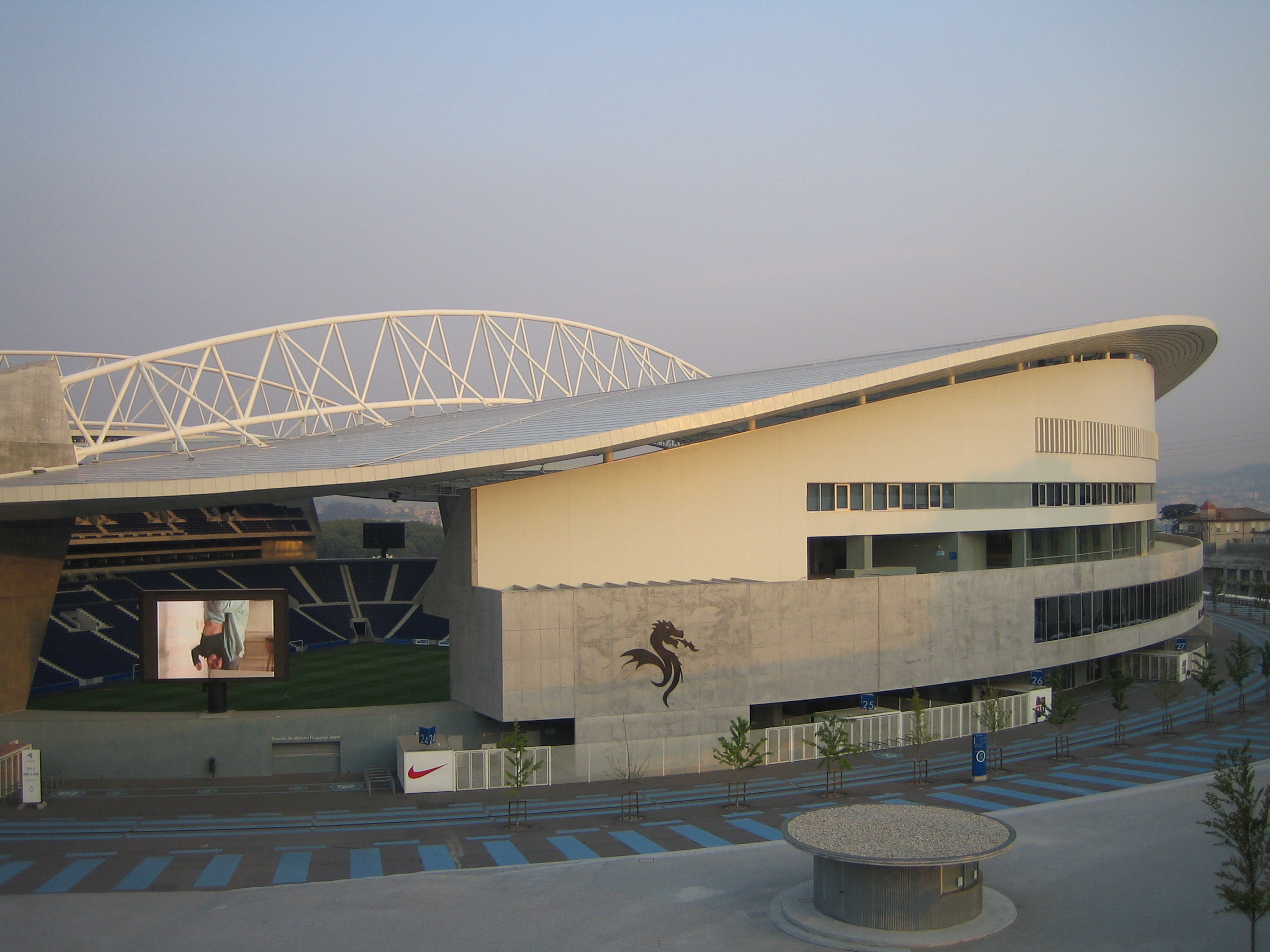
Estádio do Dragão, home of FC Porto

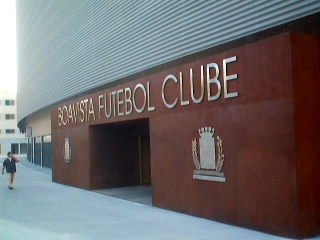
Estádio do Bessa XXI, home of Boavista

As in most Portuguese cities, football is the most popular sport. There are two main teams in Porto: FC Porto in the parish of Campanhã in the eastern part of the city, and Boavista in the area of Boavista in the parish of Ramalde, in the western part of the city, close to the city center. FC Porto is one of the Big Three teams in the main Portuguese football league, and was European champion in 1987 and 2004, won the UEFA Cup (2003) and Europa League (2011) and the Intercontinental Toyota Cup in 1987 and 2004. Boavista has won the championship once, in the 2000–01 season and reached the semi-finals of the UEFA Cup in 2003, when the team lost 2–1 to Celtic F.C..

Salgueiros from Paranhos, Porto was a regular first division club during the 1980s and 1990s, but, due to debt, the club folded in the 2000s. The club was refounded in 2008 and began playing at the regional level. It now plays at the third level of Portugal's national football pyramid.

The biggest stadiums in the city are FC Porto's Estádio do Dragão and Boavista's Estádio do Bessa. The first team in Porto to own a stadium was Académico F.C., who played in the Estádio do Lima. Académico was one of the eight teams to dispute the first division. Salgueiros sold the grounds of Estádio Engenheiro Vidal Pinheiro field to the Porto Metro and planned on building a new field in the Arca d'Água area of Porto. It was impossible to build on this plot of land due to a large underground water pocket, so the team moved to the Estádio do Mar (owned by Leixões S.C.) in the neighboring Matosinhos municipality. For the Euro 2004 football competition, held in Portugal, the Estádio do Dragão was built, replacing the old Estádio das Antas, and the Estádio do Bessa was renovated.

=== Basketball ===
The FC Porto's basketball team plays its home games at the Dragão Caixa. Its squad won the second most championships in the history of Portugal's 1st Division. Traditionally, the club provides the Portuguese national basketball team with numerous key players.

== Twin towns – sister cities ==
Porto is twinned with:

- Liège, Belgium (1977)
- Ndola, Zambia (1978)
- Nagasaki, Japan (1978)
- Recife, Brazil (1981)
- Jena, Germany (1984)
- (United Kingdom) Bristol, England (1984)
- Vigo, Spain (1986)
- Beira, Mozambique (1989)
- Bordeaux, France (1990)
- Duruelo de la Sierra, Spain (1989)
- São Vicente, Cape Verde (1993)
- Lembá, São Tomé and Príncipe (1994)
- Shanghai, China (1995)
- Macau, China (1997)
- Luanda, Angola (1999)
- León, Spain (2001)
- Santos, Brazil (2015)
- Guatemala city, Guatemala (2015)
- Shenzhen, China (2016)
- Marsala, Italy (2016)
- Timișoara, Romania (2018)
- Isfahan, Iran (2021)

== Notable people ==
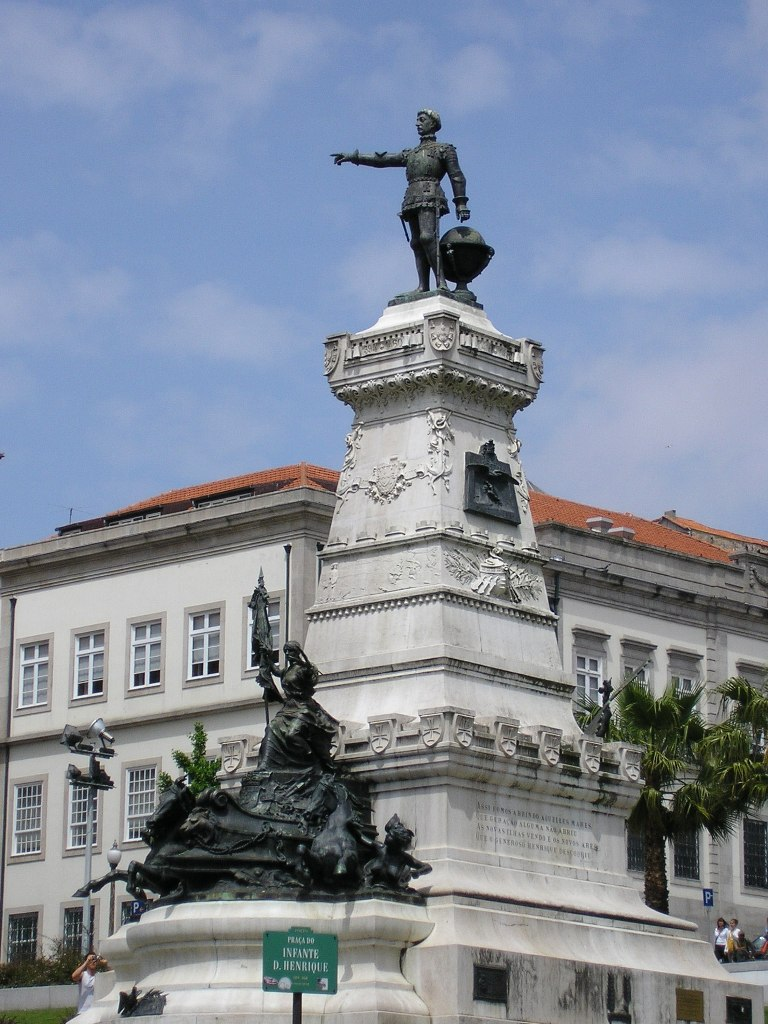
Monument to Prince Henry the Navigator

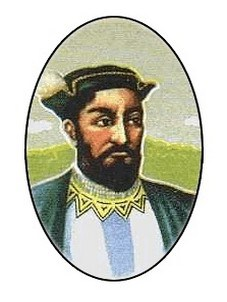
Duarte Coelho

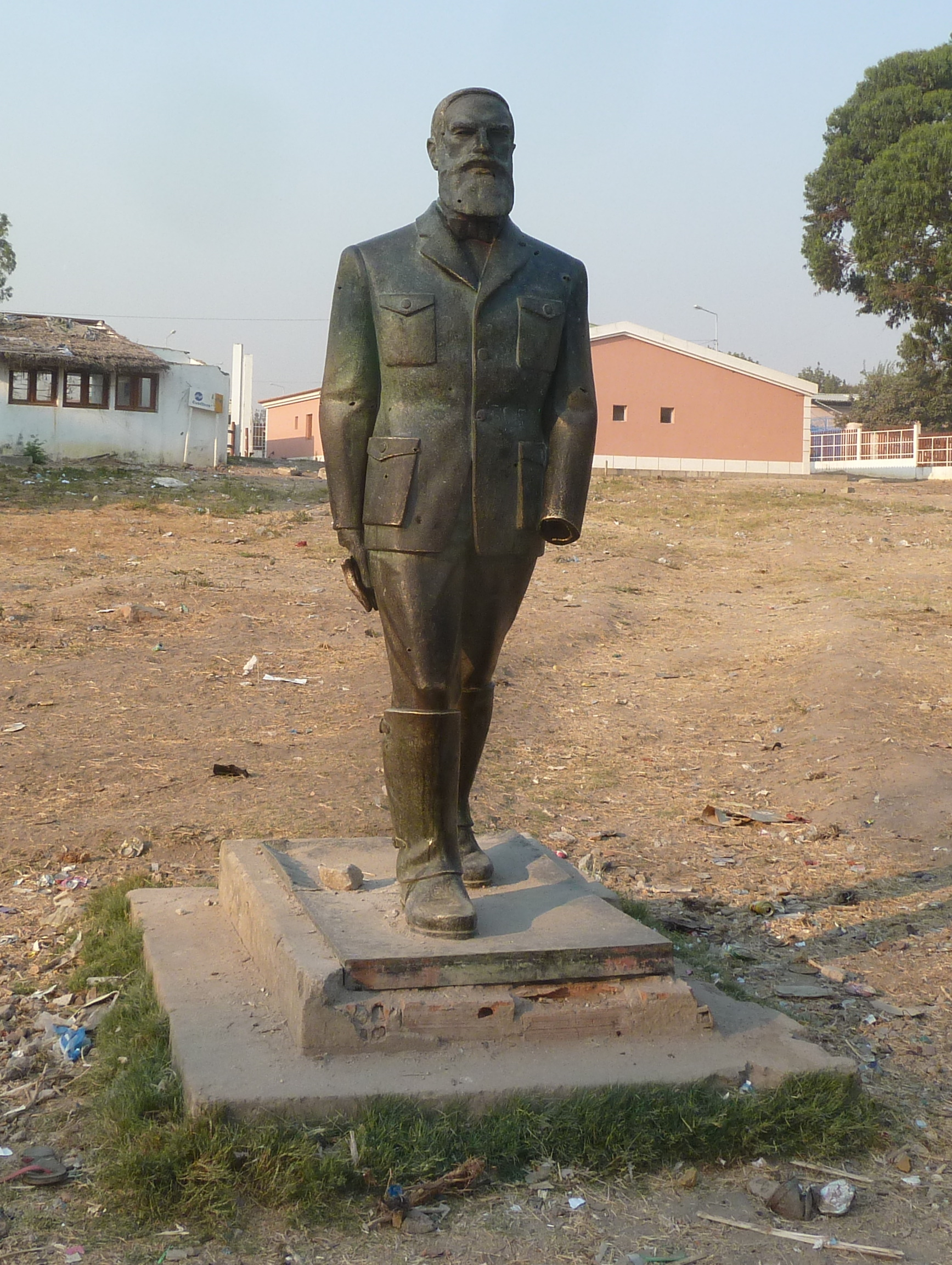
Statue of António da Silva Porto in Angola

=== Explorers and public service ===
- Prince Henry the Navigator (1394–1460), responsible for the early development of European exploration and maritime trade with other continents.
- Afonso Gonçalves Baldaia (1415–1481), nautical explorer
- Pero Vaz de Caminha (1450–1500), wrote the letter Carta do Achamento do Brasil, announcing the discovery of Brazil
- Ferdinand Magellan (c. 1480–1521), the globe circumnavigation navigator; lived and studied in Porto
- Estêvão Gomes (c. 1483–1538), cartographer and explorer
- Duarte Coelho (c. 1485–1554), nobleman, military leader, colonial administrator and founder of Olinda in Brazil
- Brás Cubas (1507–1589), explorer, colonial administrator and founder of Santos in Brazil
- Inácio de Azevedo (1526–1570), Jesuit missionary
- Sir John Croft, 1st Baronet (1778–1862), English diplomat and spy for Wellington against Napoleon
- António Pinto Soares (1780–1865), Head of State of Costa Rica in 1842
- Sir William Warre (1784–1853), English officer of the British Army
- Charles Albert of Sardinia (1798–1849), Italian monarch; died here
- António da Silva Porto (1817–1890), trader and explorer in Angola
- Venceslau de Lima (1858–1919), geologist, paleontologist, viticulturist and politician, the Prime Minister of Portugal in 1909
- Mary of the Divine Heart (1863–1899), countess Droste zu Vischering and Mother Superior of the Good Shepherd Sisters Convent; died here
- António Ferreira Gomes (1906–1989), Roman Catholic bishop of Porto
- Kaúlza de Arriaga (1915–2004), Army general, writer, professor and politician
- Maria de Lourdes Belchior Pontes (1923–1998), writer, poet, University of Porto professor and diplomat
- Francisco de Sá Carneiro (1934–1980), politician, Prime Minister of Portugal in 1980
- Manuel Clemente (born 1948), cardinal of the Catholic Church, the Metropolitan Patriarch of Lisbon since 2013 and bishop of Porto in 2007–2013
- José Pacheco Pereira (born 1949), politician, professor and political analyst
- Alexandre Quintanilha (born 1945), scientist and Member of Parliament, lives in Porto
- Rui Moreira (born 1956), businessman and politician, Mayor of Porto
- Augusto Santos Silva (born 1956), sociologist, academic, politician and Minister of Foreign Affairs
- Rui Rio (born 1957), politician, Mayor of Porto 2002–2013
- Diogo Vasconcelos (1968–2011), politician and social innovator

=== Arts and sciences ===
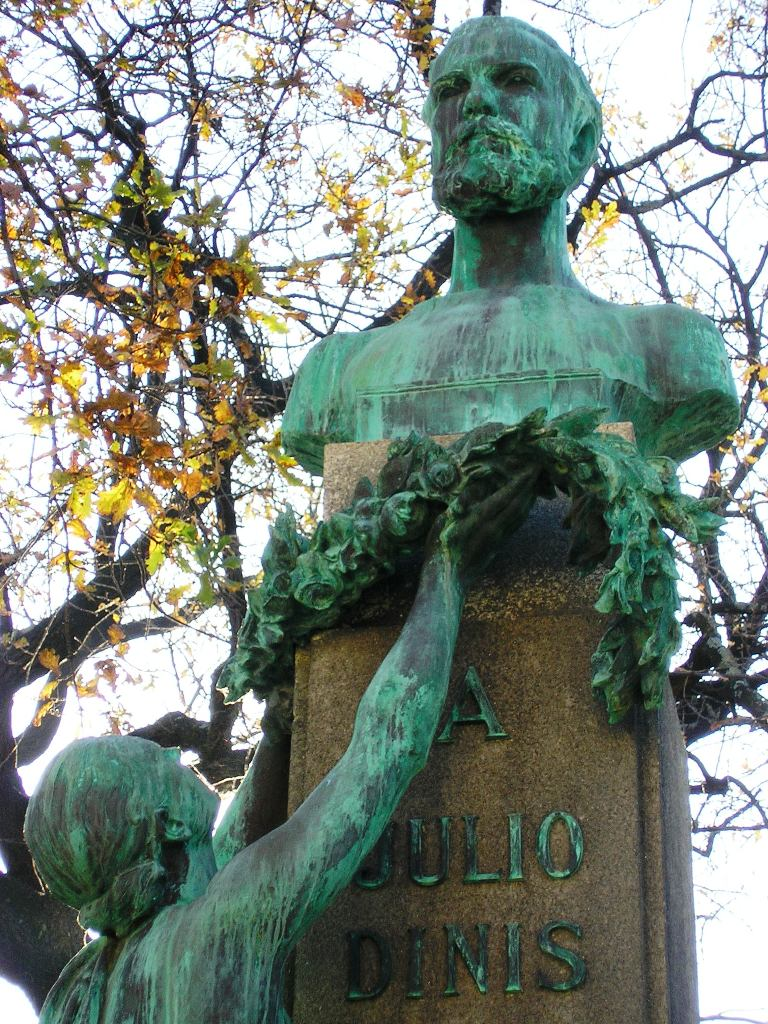
Statue of Júlio Dinis

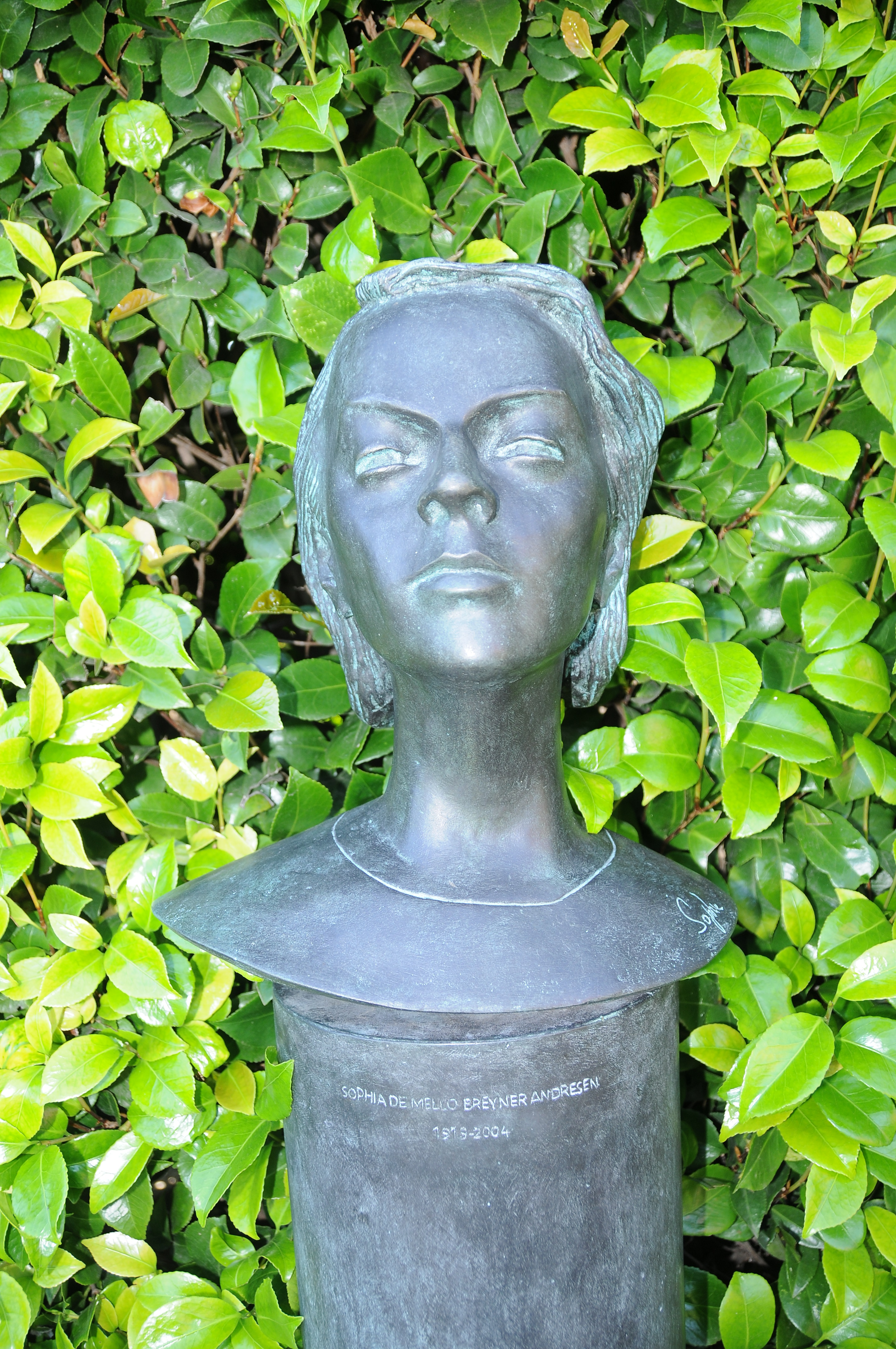
Statue of Sophia de Mello Breyner Andresen

- Pedro de Escobar (c. 1465 – after 1535), Renaissance composer of polyphony
- Daniel de Fonseca (1672 – c. 1740), Jewish court physician
- Tomás António Gonzaga (1744 – c. 1810), Brazilian poet
- Vieira Portuense (1765–1805), painter and pioneer of Neoclassicism
- Almeida Garrett (1799–1854), writer, theatre director and liberalist
- Maria Peregrina de Souza (1809–1894), novelist, poet and folklorist
- Júlio Dinis (1839–1871), doctor and poet, playwright and novelist
- Arthur Napoleão dos Santos (1843–1925), composer and pianist
- Annibal Napoleão (1845–1880), composer and pianist
- Alfredo Napoleão (1852–1917), composer and pianist
- Artur Loureiro (1853–1932), painter, lived and worked in Porto
- António Nobre (1867–1900), poet, published Só in 1892, a collection of poems
- Abigail de Paiva Cruz (1883–1944), naturalist painter, sculptor and feminist activist
- Guilhermina Suggia (1885–1950), cellist, lived and worked in the UK for many years
- Armando de Basto (1889–1923), painter, illustrator, sculptor and decorator
- Aurora Teixeira de Castro (1891–1931), feminist, notary and playwright
- Corino Andrade (1906–2005), neurologist, born in Porto
- Manoel de Oliveira (1908–2015), film director and screenwriter
- Sophia de Mello Breyner Andresen (1919–2004), poet and writer
- Ana Hatherly (1929–2015), poet, visual artist, essayist, film maker, painter and writer
- Álvaro Siza Vieira (born 1933), architect and architectural educator
- Maria Antónia Siza (1940–1973), artist
- Alexandre Quintanilha (born 1945), scientist, academic and politician
- Sérgio Godinho (born 1945), singer-songwriter, composer, actor, poet and author
- Armando Pombeiro (born 1949), chemical engineer
- Miguel Sousa Tavares (born 1952), lawyer, journalist and writer
- Eduardo Souto de Moura (born 1952), architect and academic
- Rui Reininho (born 1955), singer, lead vocalist of rock band GNR
- Antonio Veiga de Macedo (born 1955), figurative artist in the magical realist style and portrait painter
- Jorge Chaminé (born 1956), operatic baritone
- Richard Zimler (born 1956), novelist, lives and works in Porto
- Pedro Abrunhosa (born 1960), singer-songwriter, musician and composer
- J. K. Rowling (born 1965), writer who taught English as a foreign language in Porto and lived there in 1991–1993
- Armindo Freitas-Magalhães (born 1966), psychologist and scientist
- Mónica de Miranda (born 1976), visual artist, photographer, filmmaker, and researcher
- Abel Pereira (born 1978), classical horn player
- Luciana Abreu (born 1985), singer, actress and television host
- Sara Sampaio (born 1991), supermodel
- Cláudia Pascoal (born 1994), musician
- Sónia Araújo, TV host, dancer

=== Business ===
- Charles Augustus Howell (1840–1890), art dealer and alleged Blackmailer
- Fernando Van Zeller Guedes (1903–1987), co-founded Sogrape, the inspiration behind Mateus rosé
- Belmiro de Azevedo (1938–2017), entrepreneur, industrialist, founder of Sonae
- Paulo de Azevedo (born 1965), businessman, son and successor of Belmiro de Azevedo
- José Neves (born 1974), billionaire entrepreneur and the founder of Farfetch

=== Sport ===
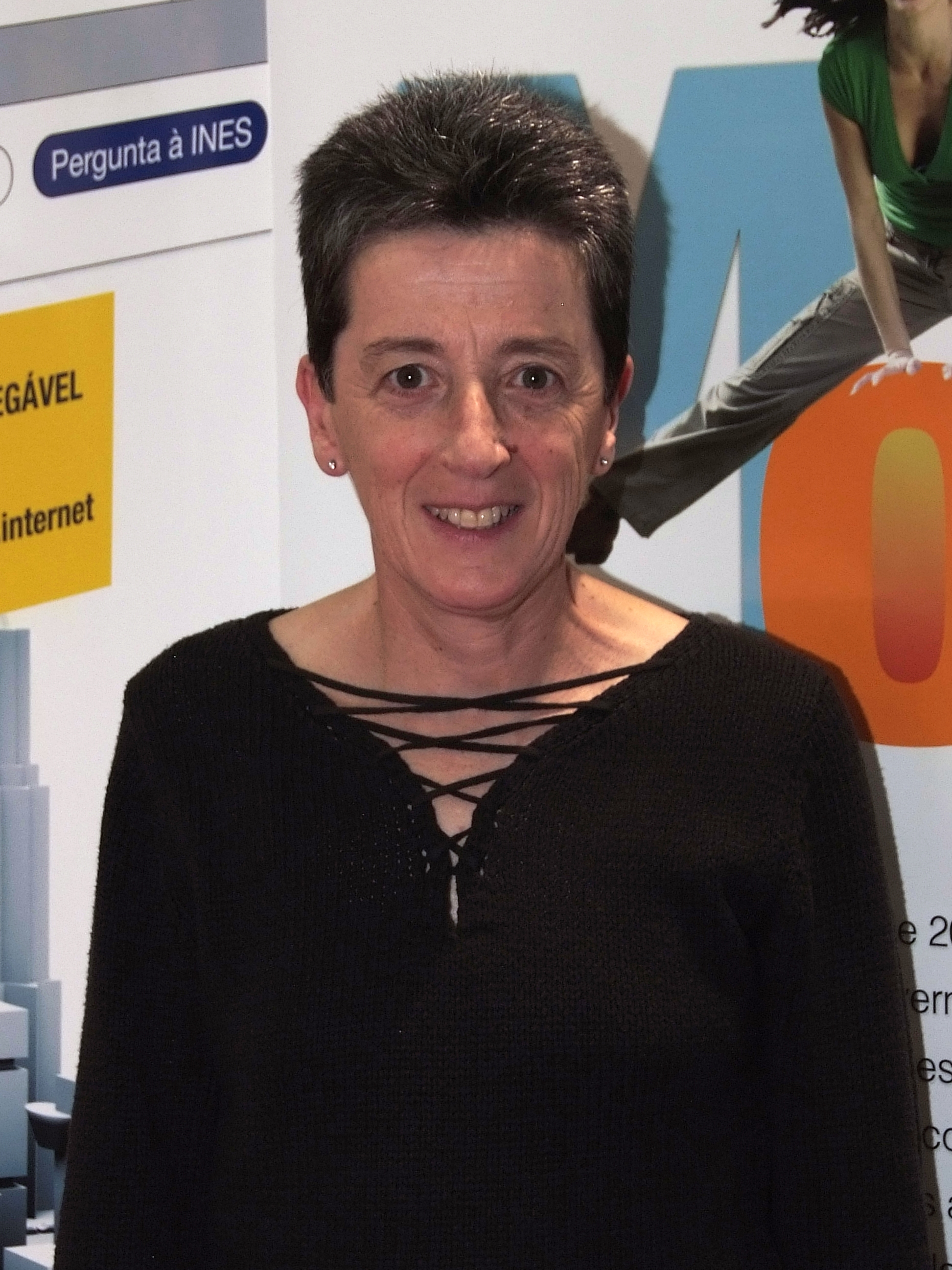
Rosa Mota, 2012

- Jorge Nuno Pinto da Costa (1937–2025), president of FC Porto
- Humberto Coelho (born 1950), footballer
- Fernando Gomes (born 1956), footballer
- Rosa Mota (born 1958), marathon runner, Olympic winner
- Nuno Marques (born 1970), tennis player
- Jorge Costa (born 1971), football player and manager
- João Pinto (born 1971), footballer
- Miguel Ramos (born 1971), racing driver
- Ricardo Sá Pinto (born 1972), football player and manager
- Tiago Monteiro (born 1976), racing driver
- Petit (born 1976), football player and manager
- André Villas-Boas (born 1977), football manager
- Bruno Alves (born 1981), footballer
- Raul Meireles (born 1983), footballer
- Diogo Leite (born 1989), footballer
- João Mário (born 1993), footballer
- Diogo Jota (1996–2025), footballer

== Bibliography ==
- Chisholm, Hugh, ed. (1911). "Oporto" . Encyclopædia Britannica. Vol. 20 (11th ed.). Cambridge University Press. pp. 137–139.
- Francis, A. D., "John Methuen and the Anglo-Portuguese Treaties of 1703". The Historical Journal, Vol. 3, No. 2, pp. 103–124 (1960).
- Glover, Michael, The Peninsular War 1807–1814. Penguin, 1974.
- Lochery, Neill, Porto: Gateway to the World. Bloomsbury Publishing, 2020.
- John Lomas, ed. (1889), "Porto", O'Shea's Guide to Spain and Portugal (8th ed.), Edinburgh: Adam & Charles Black
- Loyrette, Henri. Gustave Eiffel. New York: Rizzoli, 1985 ISBN 0 8478 0631 6
- "Porto", A Handbook for Travellers in Portugal (2nd ed.), London: John Murray, 1856, OCLC 34745440, OL 20483833M
- Redacção Quidnovi, com coordenação de José Hermano Saraiva, História de Portugal, Dicionário de Personalidades, Volume VIII, ed. QN-Edição e Conteúdos, S.A., 2004.
- Smith, Digby, The Napoleonic Wars Data Book. Greenhill, 1998.
