= 2005 Porto local election =

Portuguese municipal election

2005 Porto local elections
- 9 October 2005

All 13 Councillors in the Porto City Council 7 seats needed for a majority
- Opinion polls
- Turnout: 58.5% ▲10.2 pp
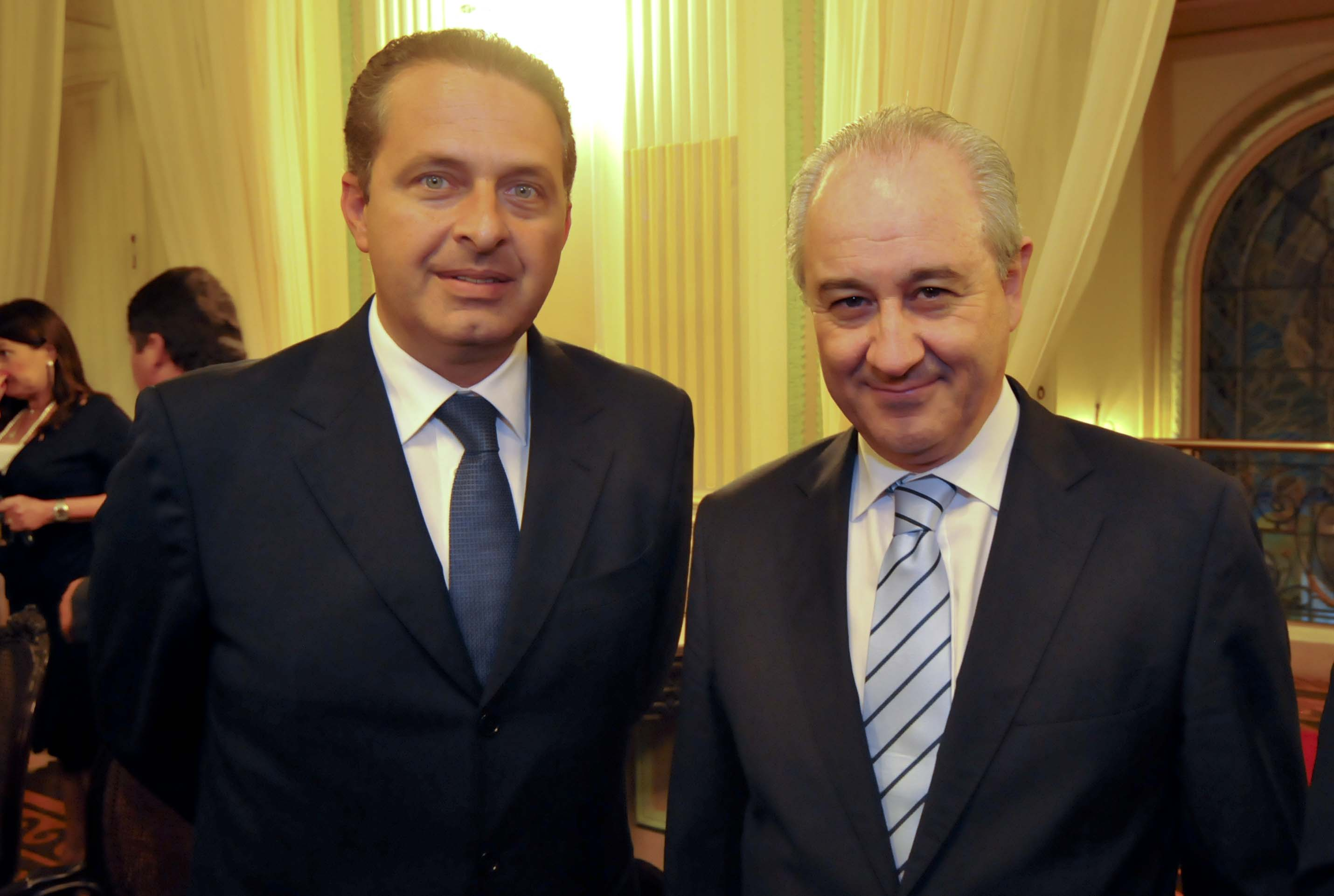

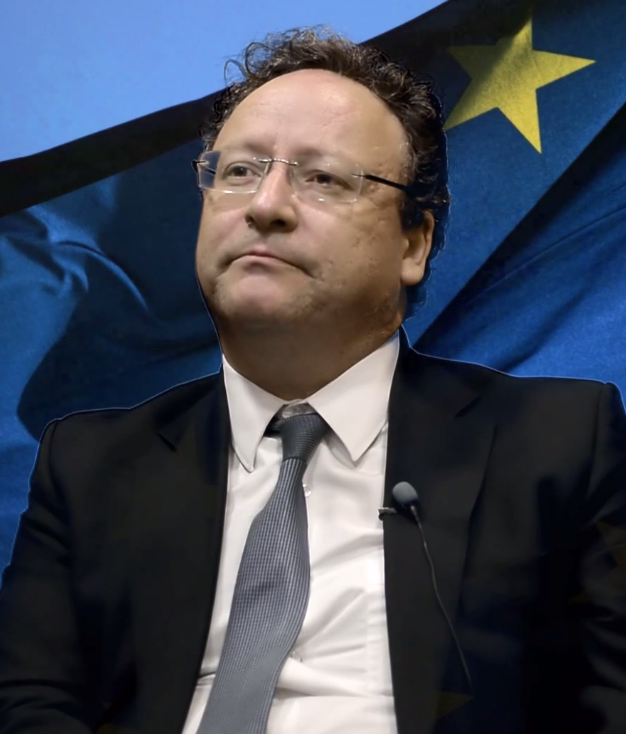

	First party	Second party	Third party
Leader	Rui Rio	Francisco Assis	Rui Sá
Party	PSD	PS	PCP
Alliance	For Porto, Once Again		CDU
Last election	6 seats, 42.8%	6 seats, 38.5%	1 seat, 10.5%
Seats won	7	5	1
Seat change	▲1	▼1	Steady
Popular vote	63,443	49,653	12,311
Percentage	46.2%	36.1%	9.0%
Swing	▲3.4 pp	▼2.4 pp	▼1.5 pp
Mayor before election
Rui Rio
PSD
Elected mayor
Rui Rio
PSD

The 2005 Porto local election was held on 9 October 2005 to elect the members of the Porto City Council.

Incumbent Mayor Rui Rio, from the PSD/CDS coalition, won a second term as Mayor of Porto, achieving 46.2% of the votes and 7 seats and defeating Socialist candidate Francisco Assis, who won 36.1% of the votes and 5 seats.

== Background ==
In the 2001 election, Rui Rio, candidate for the PSD/CDS coalition, unexpectedly won and became mayor of Porto, winning 42.8% of the votes and 6 seats. He defeated the incumbent mayor Fernando Gomes from the Socialist Party, who won 6 seats and about 38.5% of the votes. The Unitary Democratic Coalition got 1 seat and 10.5% of the votes.

Rui Rio decided to govern with the CDU, in a coalition that was called the "Vodka Laranja" or Orange Vodka. Rio's first term was marked by several controversies, from accusing the previous PS local government of concealing financial liabilities, to his clash with the city's most popular football club, FC Porto, regarding the construction of the club's new stadium.

== Electoral system ==
Each party or coalition must present a list of candidates. The lists are closed and the seats in each municipality are apportioned according to the D'Hondt method. Unlike in national legislative elections, independent lists are allowed to run.

== Parties and candidates ==
Party/Coalition		Political position	Candidate	2001 result	
Party/Coalition		Political position	Candidate	Votes (%)	Seats
PPUVM	For Porto, Once Again; Pelo Porto, Uma Vez Mais PSD, CDS–PP	Centre-right	Rui Rio	42.8%	6 / 13
PS	Socialist Party; Partido Socialista	Centre-left	Francisco Assis	38.5%	6 / 13
CDU	Unitary Democratic Coalition; Coligação Democrática Unitária PCP, PEV	Left-wing to far-left	Rui Sá	10.5%	1 / 13
BE	Left Bloc; Bloco de Esquerda	Left-wing to far-left	João Teixeira Lopes	2.6%	0 / 13
PCTP	Portuguese Workers' Communist Party; Partido Comunista dos Trabalhadores Portugueses	Far-left	João Valente Pinto	0.6%	0 / 13
PH	Humanist Party; Partido Humanista	Centre-left	Maria Alice Ribeiro	0.5%	0 / 13
PC	Porto Capital! Porto Capital! PND, PPM	Right-wing	António Almeida Garrett	—N/a	—N/a
MPT	Earth Party; Partido da Terra	Centre-right	António José de Carvalho	—N/a	—N/a
PNR	National Renovator Party; Partido Nacional Renovador	Far-right	Carlos Branco	—N/a	—N/a

== Opinion polling ==
Exit poll

Polling firm/Link	Fieldwork date	Sample size	PSD CDS	PS	CDU	BE	O	Lead
2005 local election	9 Oct 2005	—N/a	46.2; 7	36.1; 5	9.0; 1	4.2; 0	4.5; 0	10.1
UCP	9 Oct 2005	?	43–48	36–40	7–10	3–5	–	7–8
Eurosondagem	2–5 Oct 2005	1,057	41.2	39.1	9.1	5.9	4.7	2.1
Intercampus	1–5 Oct 2005	1,000	37.5	39.3	10.2	6.6	6.4	1.8
UCP	1–2 Oct 2005	2,392	43	36	7	6	7	7
Marktest	1 Oct 2005	401	49.1	29.5	8.2	6.0	7.1	19.6
UCP	4–6 Jul 2005	910	55	29	9	3	4	26
IPOM	16–17 Mar 2005	598	44.3	35.3	—N/a	—N/a	20.4	9.0
Eurosondagem	13–14 Mar 2005	757	46	40	—N/a	—N/a	14	6
2001 local election	16 Dec 2001	—N/a	42.7; 6	38.5; 6	10.5; 1	2.6; 0	5.7; 0	4.2

== Results ==
=== Municipal Council ===
Summary of the 9 October 2005 Municipal Council elections results in Porto
Parties	Votes	%	±pp swing	Councillors	
Parties	Votes	%	±pp swing	Total	±
Social Democratic / People's	63,430	46.17	▲3.4	7	▲1
Socialist	49,653	36.14	▼2.3	5	▼1
Unitary Democratic Coalition	12,309	8.96	▼1.5	1	0
Left Bloc	5,797	4.22	▲1.7	0	0
Portuguese Workers' Communist	767	0.56	▼0.3	0	0
New Democracy / People's Monarchist	439	0.32	—N/a	0	—N/a
Earth	236	0.17	—N/a	0	—N/a
Humanist	200	0.15	▼0.3	0	0
National Renovator	121	0.09	—N/a	0	—N/a
Total valid	132,952	96.77	▲1.2	13	0
Blank ballots	2,995	2.18	▼0.8		
Invalid ballots	1,437	1.05	▼0.4		
Total	137,384	100.00			
Registered voters/turnout	234,749	58.52	▲10.3		
Source: Porto 2005 election results

=== Municipal Assembly ===
Summary of the 9 October 2005 Porto Municipal Assembly elections results
Parties	Votes	%	±pp swing	Seats	
Parties	Votes	%	±pp swing	Total	±
Social Democratic / People's	60,049	43.71	▲0.5	18	0
Socialist	47,867	34.84	▼1.1	15	▼1
Unitary Democratic Coalition	14,317	10.42	▲0.6	4	0
Left Bloc	9,347	6.80	▲0.7	2	▲1
New Democracy / People's Monarchist	831	0.60	—N/a	0	—N/a
Total valid	132,411	96.38	▲0.9	39	0
Blank ballots	3,370	2.45	▼0.8		
Invalid ballots	1,606	1.17	▼0.1		
Total	137,387	100.00			
Registered voters/turnout	234,749	58.52	▲10.3		
Source: Porto 2005 election results

=== Parish Assemblies ===
Results of the 9 October 2005 Porto Parish Assembly elections
Parish	%	S	%	S	%	S	%	S	Total S
Parish	PPUVM		PS		CDU		BE		Total S
Aldoar	35.8	5	44.7	6	8.8	1	6.6	1	13
Bonfim	47.1	10	32.4	6	10.1	2	6.2	1	19
Campanhã	27.6	6	50.1	10	13.2	2	5.4	1	19
Cedofeita	50.5	10	28.8	6	9.3	2	6.9	1	19
Foz do Douro	53.7	8	28.0	4	8.9	1	5.0	-	13
Lordelo do Ouro	45.0	7	34.6	5	10.8	1	6.0	-	13
Massarelos	44.8	6	32.4	5	12.2	1	6.9	1	13
Miragaia	23.5	2	42.2	4	25.7	3	5.8	-	9
Nevogilde	73.8	8	16.5	1	2.5	-	3.2	-	9
Paranhos	42.9	10	34.5	8	9.3	2	6.2	1	21
Ramalde	46.2	9	36.4	7	9.3	2	6.2	1	19
Santo Ildefonso	46.3	7	33.0	5	10.5	1	6.5	-	13
São Nicolau	29.0	3	43.8	5	15.1	1	7.5	-	9
Sé	34.4	3	42.9	5	14.5	1	3.9	-	9
Vitória	29.6	3	47.6	5	13.7	1	4.8	-	9
Total	42.9	97	36.0	82	10.4	21	6.0	7	207
Source: Election Results
