= 2009 Porto local election =

Portuguese municipal election

2009 Porto local elections
- 11 October 2009

All 13 Councillors in the Porto City Council 7 seats needed for a majority
- Opinion polls
- Turnout: 56.8% ▼1.8 pp
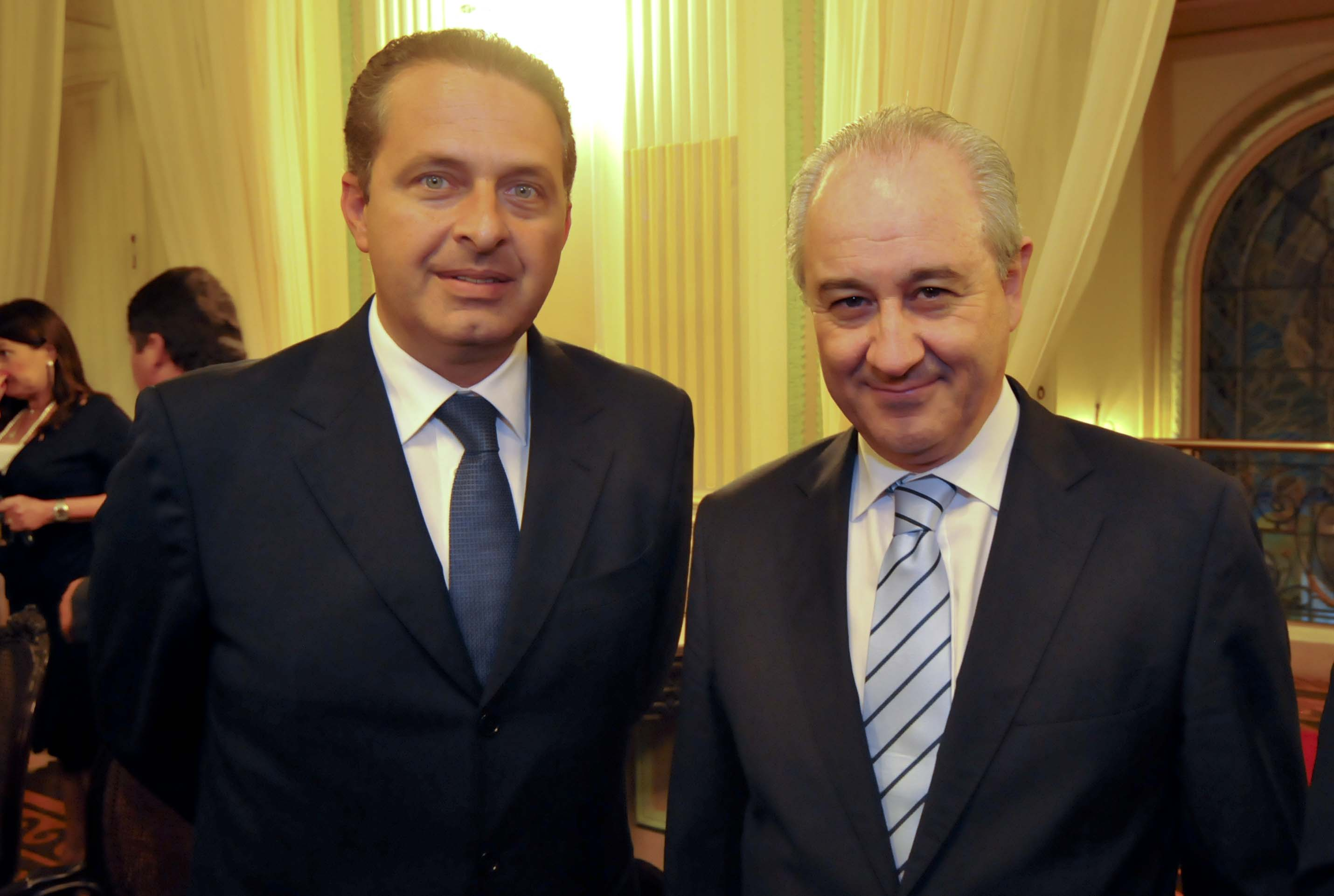

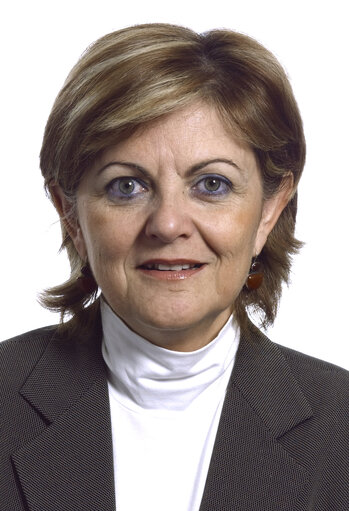

	First party	Second party	Third party
Leader	Rui Rio	Elisa Ferreira	Rui Sá
Party	PSD	PS	PCP
Alliance	Porto First		CDU
Last election	7 seats, 46.2%	5 seats, 36.4%	1 seat, 9.0%
Seats won	7	5	1
Seat change	Steady	Steady	Steady
Popular vote	62,507	45,682	12,904
Percentage	47.5%	34.7%	9.8%
Swing	▲1.3 pp	▼1.4 pp	▲0.8 pp
Mayor before election
Rui Rio
PSD
Elected mayor
Rui Rio
PSD

The 2009 Porto local election was held on 11 October 2009 to elect the members of the Porto City Council.

Incumbent Mayor Rui Rio, from the PSD/CDS coalition, won a third and final term as Mayor of Porto, achieving 47.5% of the votes and 7 seats and defeating Socialist candidate Elisa Ferreira, who won 34.7% of the votes and 5 seats.

== Background ==
In the 2005 election, Rui Rio, candidate for the PSD/CDS coalition, won a second term as mayor of Porto, winning 46.2% of the votes and 7 seats, an absolute majority. The Socialist Party, led by Francisco Assis, achieved second place with 5 seats and about 36.4% of the votes. The Unitary Democratic Coalition got 1 seat and 9.0% of the votes.

== Electoral system ==
Each party or coalition must present a list of candidates. The winner of the most voted list for the municipal council is automatically elected mayor, similar to first-past-the-post (FPTP). The lists are closed and the seats in each municipality are apportioned according to the D'Hondt method. Unlike in national legislative elections, independent lists are allowed to run.

== Parties and candidates ==
Party/Coalition		Political position	Candidate	2005 result	
Party/Coalition		Political position	Candidate	Votes (%)	Seats
PP	Porto First; O Porto em Primeiro PSD, CDS–PP	Centre-right	Rui Rio	46.2%	7 / 13
PS	Socialist Party; Partido Socialista	Centre-left	Elisa Ferreira	36.2%	5 / 13
CDU	Unitary Democratic Coalition; Coligação Democrática Unitária PCP, PEV	Left-wing to far-left	Rui Sá	9.0%	1 / 13
BE	Left Bloc; Bloco de Esquerda	Left-wing to far-left	João Teixeira Lopes	4.2%	0 / 13
PCTP	Portuguese Workers' Communist Party; Partido Comunista dos Trabalhadores Portugueses	Far-left	João Valente Pinto	0.6%	0 / 13

== Opinion polling ==
Exit poll

Polling firm/Link	Fieldwork date	Sample size	PSD CDS	PS	CDU	BE	O	Lead
2009 local election	11 Oct 2009	—N/a	47.5; 7	34.7; 5	9.8; 1	5.0; 0	3.0; 0	12.8
UCP–CESOP	11 Oct 2009	?	45–49; 6/7	33–37; 5/6	8.5–10.5; 0/1	4–6; 0	–	12
Eurosondagem	11 Oct 2009	?	43.3– 47.1; 6/7	35.5– 39.9; 5/6	7.9– 10.1; 0/1	3.9– 5.7; 0	–	7.2– 7.8
Intercampus	11 Oct 2009	?	44.9– 50.5	31.3– 36.8	7.8– 11.4	3.3– 6.9	–	13.6– 13.7
Marktest	2–7 Oct 2009	400	51.0	31.0	7.8	5.7	4.7	20.0
UCP–CESOP	2–5 Oct 2009	2,571	47	33	9	7	4	14
Aximage	2–4 Oct 2009	500	46.4	34.3	9.7	5.8	3.8	12.1
Eurosondagem	28–30 Sep 2009	736	48.0	33.3	9.4	5.8	3.5	14.7
Intercampus	28–30 Sep 2009	800	44.4	35.9	8.2	7.9	3.6	8.5
Marktest	3–6 Sep 2009	399	44.7	31.1	9.6	7.8	6.8	13.6
IPOM	16–19 Jun 2009	797	55.2	23.5	9.2	8.1	4.1	31.7
UCP–CESOP	8–9 Jun 2009	1,002	54	23	4	7	12	31
2005 local election	9 Oct 2005	—N/a	46.2; 7	36.1; 5	9.0; 1	4.2; 0	4.5; 0	10.1

== Results ==
=== Municipal Council ===
Summary of the 11 October 2009 Municipal Council elections results in Porto
Graph of the party split among 13 seats.
Parties	Votes	%	±pp swing	Councillors	
Parties	Votes	%	±pp swing	Total	±
Social Democratic / People's	62,507	47.48	▲1.3	7	0
Socialist	45,682	34.70	▼1.4	5	0
Unitary Democratic Coalition	12,904	9.80	▲0.8	1	0
Left Bloc	6,552	4.98	▲0.8	0	0
Portuguese Workers' Communist	915	0.70	▲0.1	0	0
Total valid	128,560	97.65	▲0.9	13	0
Blank ballots	1,816	1.38	▲0.8		
Invalid ballots	1,273	0.97	▼0.1		
Total	131,649	100.00			
Registered voters/turnout	231,978	56.75	▼1.8		
Source: Porto 2009 election results

=== Municipal Assembly ===
Summary of the 11 October 2009 Porto Municipal Assembly elections results
Graph of the party split among 39 seats.
Parties	Votes	%	±pp swing	Seats	
Parties	Votes	%	±pp swing	Total	±
Social Democratic / People's	58,168	44.19	▲0.5	18	0
Socialist	44,422	33.75	▼1.1	14	▼1
Unitary Democratic Coalition	14,506	11.02	▲0.6	4	0
Left Bloc	9,893	7.52	▲0.7	3	▲1
Hope for Portugal Movement	1,261	0.96	—N/a	0	—N/a
Total valid	128,560	97.65	▲1.3	39	0
Blank ballots	2,204	1.67	▼0.8		
Invalid ballots	1,184	0.90	▼0.3		
Total	131,638	100.00			
Registered voters/turnout	231,978	56.75	▼1.8		
Source: Porto 2009 election results

=== Parish Assemblies ===
Results of the 11 October 2009 Porto Parish Assembly elections
Parish	%	S	%	S	%	S	%	S	Total S
Parish	PP		PS		CDU		BE		Total S
Aldoar	38.0	5	44.5	6	7.4	1	6.6	1	13
Bonfim	47.7	10	31.1	6	10.2	2	7.5	1	19
Campanhã	29.1	6	48.1	10	12.5	2	7.1	1	19
Cedofeita	50.0	10	28.7	6	10.3	2	7.1	1	19
Foz do Douro	56.4	8	27.2	4	7.5	1	5.2	-	13
Lordelo do Ouro	47.5	7	32.3	5	11.1	1	6.2	-	13
Massarelos	46.0	7	33.9	5	10.5	1	6.5	-	13
Miragaia	33.4	3	36.9	4	19.8	2	7.1	-	9
Nevogilde	76.9	8	14.5	1	2.0	-	3.4	-	9
Paranhos	45.9	11	33.4	7	10.0	2	7.5	1	21
Ramalde	47.9	10	34.0	7	8.2	1	6.4	1	19
Santo Ildefonso	44.7	7	29.9	4	9.7	1	7.7	1	13
Sé	24.1	2	50.6	5	17.7	2	4.8	-	9
São Nicolau	24.4	2	39.3	4	22.9	2	10.0	1	9
Vitória	26.3	3	52.2	5	11.6	1	6.5	-	9
Total	44.4	99	35.1	79	10.2	21	6.8	8	207
Source: Election Results
