= 2001 Porto local election =

Portuguese municipal election

2001 Porto local elections
- 16 December 2001

All 13 Councillors in the Porto City Council 7 seats needed for a majority
- Opinion polls
- Turnout: 48.3% ▲0.2 pp
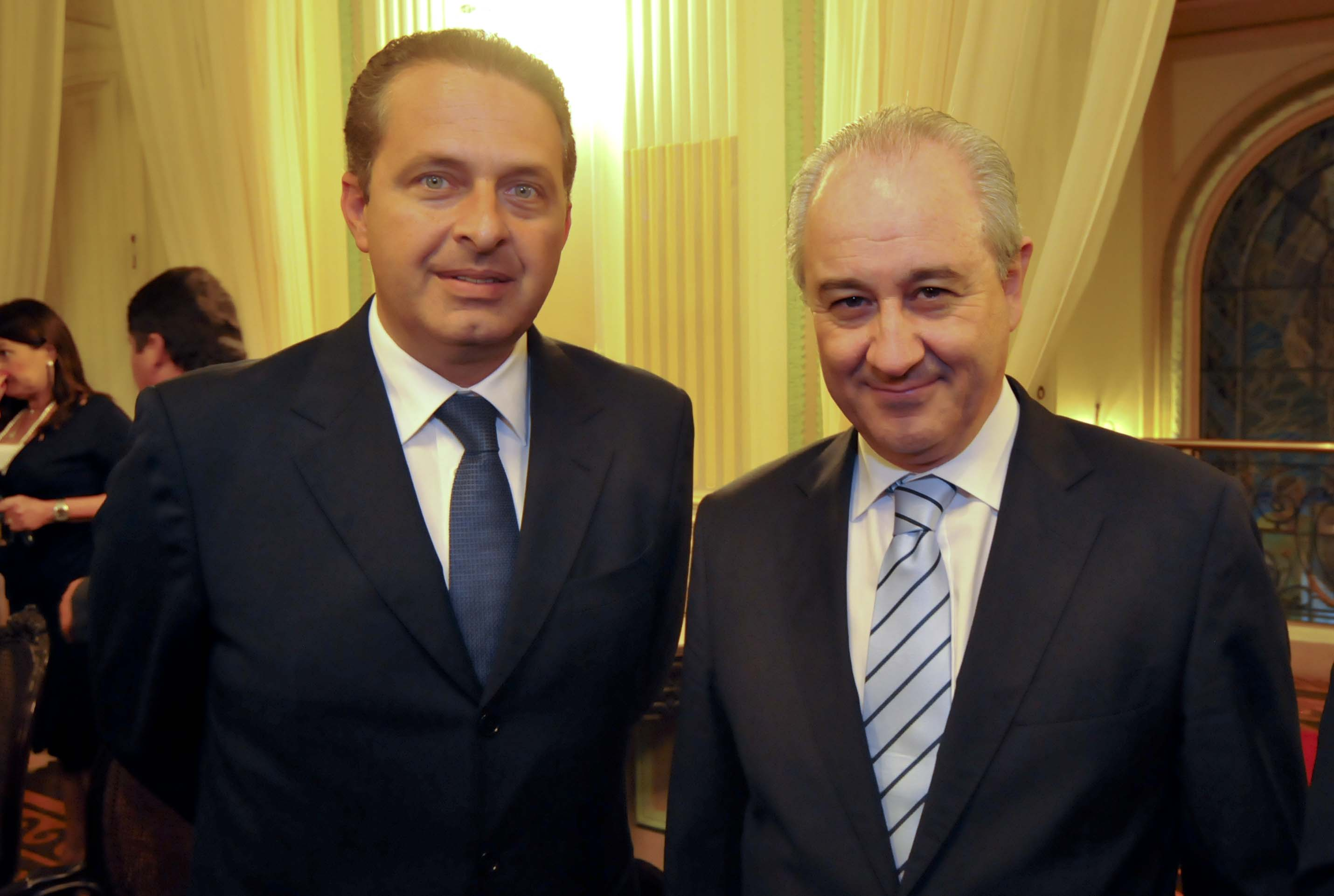

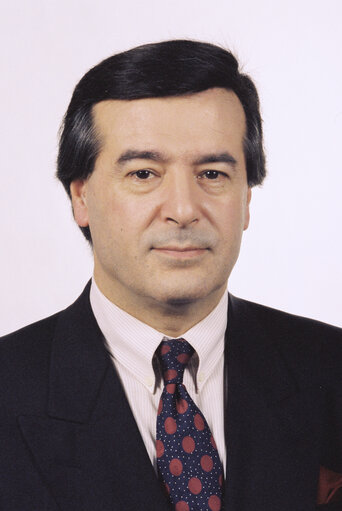

	First party	Second party	Third party
Leader	Rui Rio	Fernando Gomes	Rui Sá
Party	PSD	PS	PCP
Alliance	For Porto, Once Again		CDU
Last election	4 seats, 26.3%	8 seats, 55.8%	1 seat, 11.3%
Seats won	6	6	1
Seat change	▲2	▼2	Steady
Popular vote	50,724	45,634	12,311
Percentage	42.8%	38.5%	10.5%
Swing	▲16.5 pp	▼17.3 pp	▼0.8 pp
Mayor before election
Nuno Cardoso
PS
Elected mayor
Rui Rio
PSD

The 2001 Porto local election was held on 16 December 2001 to elect the members of the Porto City Council.

In a major upset victory, Rui Rio, the Social Democratic Party (PSD) and CDS – People's Party (CDS–PP) coalition candidate, defeated former Socialist Party (PS) mayor Fernando Gomes, who led every single poll prior to the election. Following the election, Rio made a deal with Communist councillor Rui Sá in order to have a majority in the council.

== Background ==
In the 1997 election, incumbent Socialist Mayor Fernando Gomes was re-elected for a third term, defeating the CDS/PSD candidate Carlos Azeredo with a 55.8% to 26.3% margin.

In 1999, Fernando Gomes resigned as Mayor to join António Guterres' second government as Minister Adjunct and of Internal Administration. He was replaced by Nuno Cardoso, who decided not to run for re-election to allow Gomes to return to the mayorship, however, this decision—to resign from mayor, become a minister in Lisbon, and then run again for mayor—was considered to have been poorly received by voters in Porto.

== Electoral system ==
Each party or coalition must present a list of candidates. The lists are closed and the seats in each municipality are apportioned according to the D'Hondt method. Unlike in national legislative elections, independent lists are allowed to run.

== Parties and candidates ==
Party/Coalition		Political position	Candidate	1997 result	
Party/Coalition		Political position	Candidate	Votes (%)	Seats
PS	Socialist Party; Partido Socialista	Centre-left	Fernando Gomes	55.8%	8 / 13
PPUVM	For Porto, Once Again; Pelo Porto, Uma Vez Mais PSD, CDS–PP	Centre-right	Rui Rio	26.3%	4 / 13
CDU	Unitary Democratic Coalition; Coligação Democrática Unitária PCP, PEV	Left-wing to far-left	Rui Sá	11.3%	1 / 13
PCTP	Portuguese Workers' Communist Party; Partido Comunista dos Trabalhadores Portugueses	Far-left	Valentim Martins	0.4%	0 / 13
BE	Left Bloc; Bloco de Esquerda	Left-wing to far-left	João Teixeira Lopes	—N/a	0 / 13
PH	Humanist Party; Partido Humanista	Centre-left	Alice Mouta Ribeiro	—N/a	0 / 13

== Opinion polling ==
Exit poll

Polling firm/Link	Date Released	Sample size	PS	PSD CDS	CDU	BE	O	Lead
2001 local election	16 Dec 2001	—N/a	38.5; 6	42.7; 6	10.5; 1	2.6; 0	5.7; 0	4.2
UCP	16 Dec 2001	?	39– 44	39– 44	8– 10	2–3	–	Tie
Eurosondagem	16 Dec 2001	?	40.5– 44.3	38.5– 42.3	9.2– 11.8	2.1– 2.9	–	2.0
Intercampus	16 Dec 2001	?	39.7– 45.7	36.5– 42.5	6.3– 12.3	1.6– 4.6	–	3.2
Marktest	13 Dec 2001	?	48; 7	38; 5	9; 1	3; 0	2; 0	10
UCP	11 Dec 2001	1,041	45.5; 7	36.8; 5	8.7; 0	2.8; 0	6.2; 0	8.7
UCP	13 Nov 2001	1,041	54.7	32.1	5.0	3.5	4.7	22.6
Eurosondagem	11 Oct 2001	1,025	53.0; 8	31.3; 4	10.1; 1	4.0; 0	1.6; 0	21.7
Euroexpansão	Oct 2001	?	66	29	—N/a	—N/a	5	37
Euroexpansão	21 Apr 2001	?	55	14	—N/a	—N/a	31	41
1997 local election	14 Dec 1997	—N/a	55.8; 8	26.3; 4	11.3; 1	—N/a	6.6; 0	29.5

== Results ==
=== Municipal Council ===
Summary of the 16 December 2001 Municipal Council elections results in Porto
Graph of the party split among 13 seats.
Parties	Votes	%	±pp swing	Councillors	
Parties	Votes	%	±pp swing	Total	±
Social Democratic / People's	50,724	42.75	▲16.5	6	▲2
Socialist	45,634	38.46	▼17.3	6	▼2
Unitary Democratic Coalition	12,425	10.47	▼0.8	1	0
Left Bloc	3,037	2.56	—N/a	0	—N/a
Portuguese Workers' Communist	1,013	0.85	▲0.4	0	0
Humanist	530	0.45	—N/a	0	—N/a
Total valid	113,363	95.54	0.0	13	0
Blank ballots	3,561	3.00	▼0.3		
Invalid ballots	1,725	1.45	▲0.3		
Total	118,649	100.00			
Registered voters/turnout	245,805	48.27	▲0.2		
Source: Porto 2001 election results

=== Municipal Assembly ===
Summary of the 16 December 2001 Porto Municipal Assembly elections results
Graph of the party split among 39 seats.
Parties	Votes	%	±pp swing	Seats	
Parties	Votes	%	±pp swing	Total	±
Social Democratic / People's	50,592	42.64	▲11.4	18	▲5
Socialist	45,014	37.94	▼12.7	15	▼6
Unitary Democratic Coalition	14,317	11.42	▼0.9	4	▼1
Left Bloc	4,189	3.53	—N/a	1	—N/a
Total valid	114,112	95.53	▼0.5	39	0
Blank ballots	3,815	3.22	▲0.3		
Invalid ballots	1,496	1.26	▲0.2		
Total	118,654	100.00			
Registered voters/turnout	245,805	48.27	▲0.2		
Source: Porto 2001 election results

=== Parish Assemblies ===
Results of the 16 December 2001 Porto Parish Assembly elections
Parish	%	S	%	S	%	S	%	S	%	S	Total S
Parish	PPUVM		PS		CDU		BE		IND		Total S
Aldoar	34.7	5	49.6	7	8.2	1	3.4	-			13
Bonfim	45.9	10	33.6	7	12.4	2	3.0	-			19
Campanhã	30.8	6	50.2	11	12.2	2	2.8	-			19
Cedofeita	49.9	11	31.5	6	10.4	2	3.9	-			19
Foz do Douro	52.7	8	28.1	4	12.0	1	3.2	-			13
Lordelo do Ouro	40.9	6	40.3	6	11.1	1	3.3	-			13
Massarelos	40.8	6	41.1	6	10.7	1	3.4	-			13
Miragaia	20.0	2	46.9	5	27.6	2	2.3	-			9
Nevogilde	75.0	8	15.0	1	3.5	-	2.2	-			9
Paranhos	42.0	10	39.0	9	10.7	2	3.3	-			21
Ramalde	42.8	9	40.1	8	9.3	2	3.0	-			19
Santo Ildefonso	41.6	6	41.2	6	9.9	1	3.1	-			13
São Nicolau	31.9	3	36.2	4	12.8	1	1.8	-	14.1	1	9
Sé	37.0	5	42.7	6	13.6	2	1.6	-			13
Vitória	35.3	3	44.5	5	12.8	1	2.2	-			9
Total	42.0	98	39.2	91	11.0	21	3.1	0	0.2	1	211
Source: Election Results
