= Festa de São João do Porto =

Portuguese festival

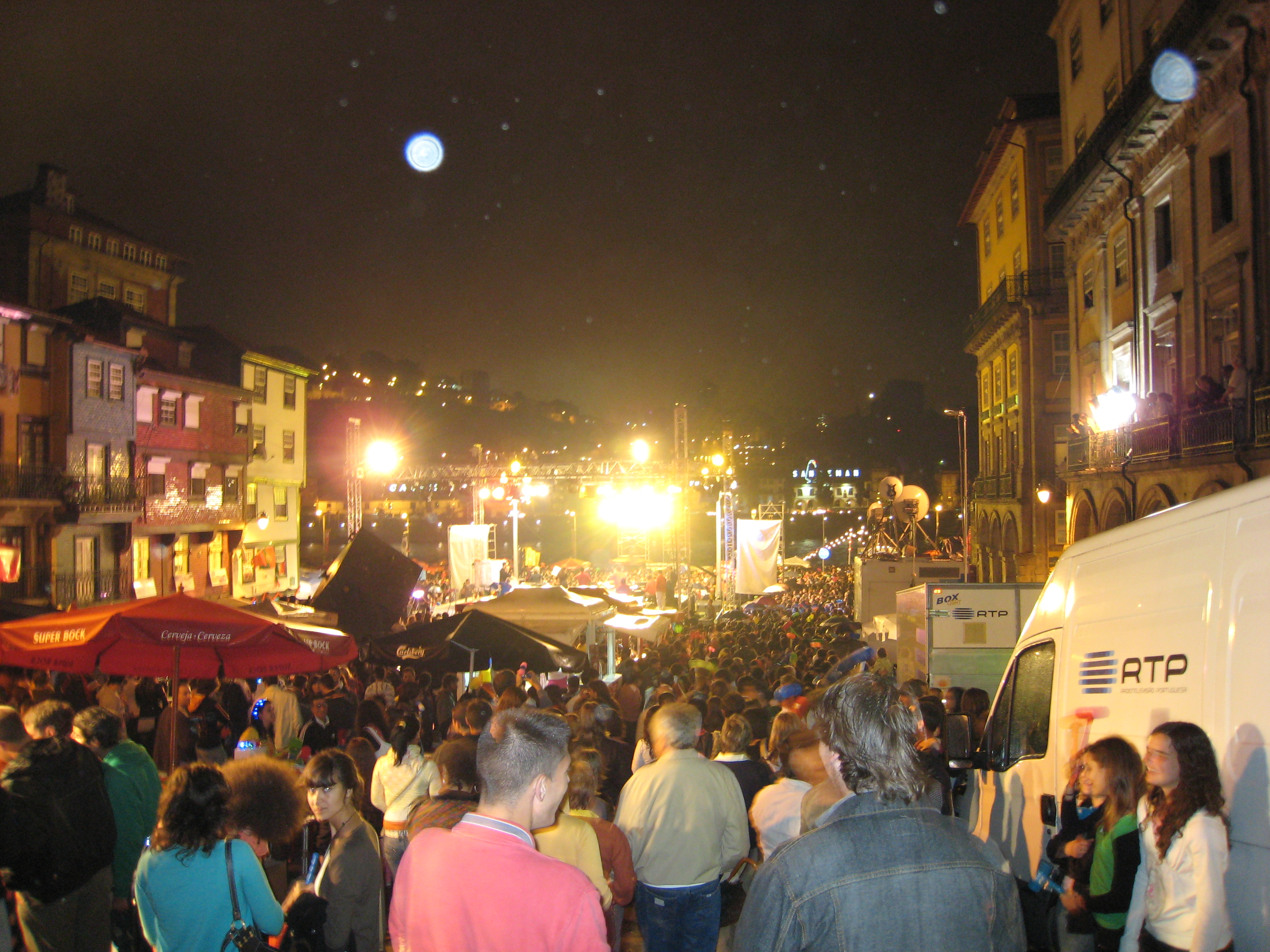
- The Praça da Ribeira, in Porto, during São João
- Observed by: Porto
- Type: ethnographic; midsummer
- Celebrations: competitions; bonfires; fireworks; feasting; drinking; raves; procession; decorations; national dress; sports
- Date: 23 June
- Next time: 23 June 2027
- Frequency: annual

Festa de São João do Porto (Portuguese for 'Festival of St John of Porto') is a festival during Midsummer, on the night of 23 June (Saint John's Eve), in the city of Porto, in the north of Portugal, as thousands of people come to the city centre and more traditional neighborhoods to pay a tribute to Saint John the Baptist, in a party that mixes sacred and profane traditions.

== History ==
Festivities have been held in the city for more than six centuries. During the 19th century Saint John's day became the city's most important festival.

== Description ==
The party starts early in the afternoon of 23 June and usually lasts until the morning of 24 June.

A tradition with roots in pagan courtship rituals is for people to give to smell or hit each other either with garlic flowers (blooming Leek) or other aromatic herbs or, more recently, soft plastic hammers, as a way to give good luck and give protection.

Traditional attractions of the night include street concerts, dancing parties, bonfire jumping, eating barbecued sardines, Caldo verde and meat, drinking wine and releasing illuminated flame-propelled balloons over Porto's summer sky.

At midnight, partygoers make a short break to look at the sky at Saint John's firework spectacle, which now includes multimedia shows. The party has Christian roots but is also mixed with pagan traditions, with the fireworks embodying the spirit of tribute to the sun.

The fireworks mark the end of the official festivities. It is common for citizens of Porto to keep celebrating until the first hours in the morning. They walk from Porto's riverside core – Ribeira (for instance the parish of São Nicolau) up to the seaside in Foz (parishes of Foz do Douro and Nevogilde) or in the nearby suburb of Matosinhos where they wait for the sunrise near the sea, and sometimes, take a bath in the ocean.

In June 2004, a journalist from The Guardian commented that "Porto's Festa de São João is one of Europe's liveliest street festivals, yet it is relatively unknown outside the country".

== See also ==
- Bonfires of Saint John – Festival in Alicante, Spain
- Saint John's Eve – Evening of June 23, celebration
- Midsummer – Holiday held close to the summer solstice
