= Beco dos Redemoinhos Residence =

Residence of Beco dos Redemoinhos
- Casa do Beco dos Redemoinhos
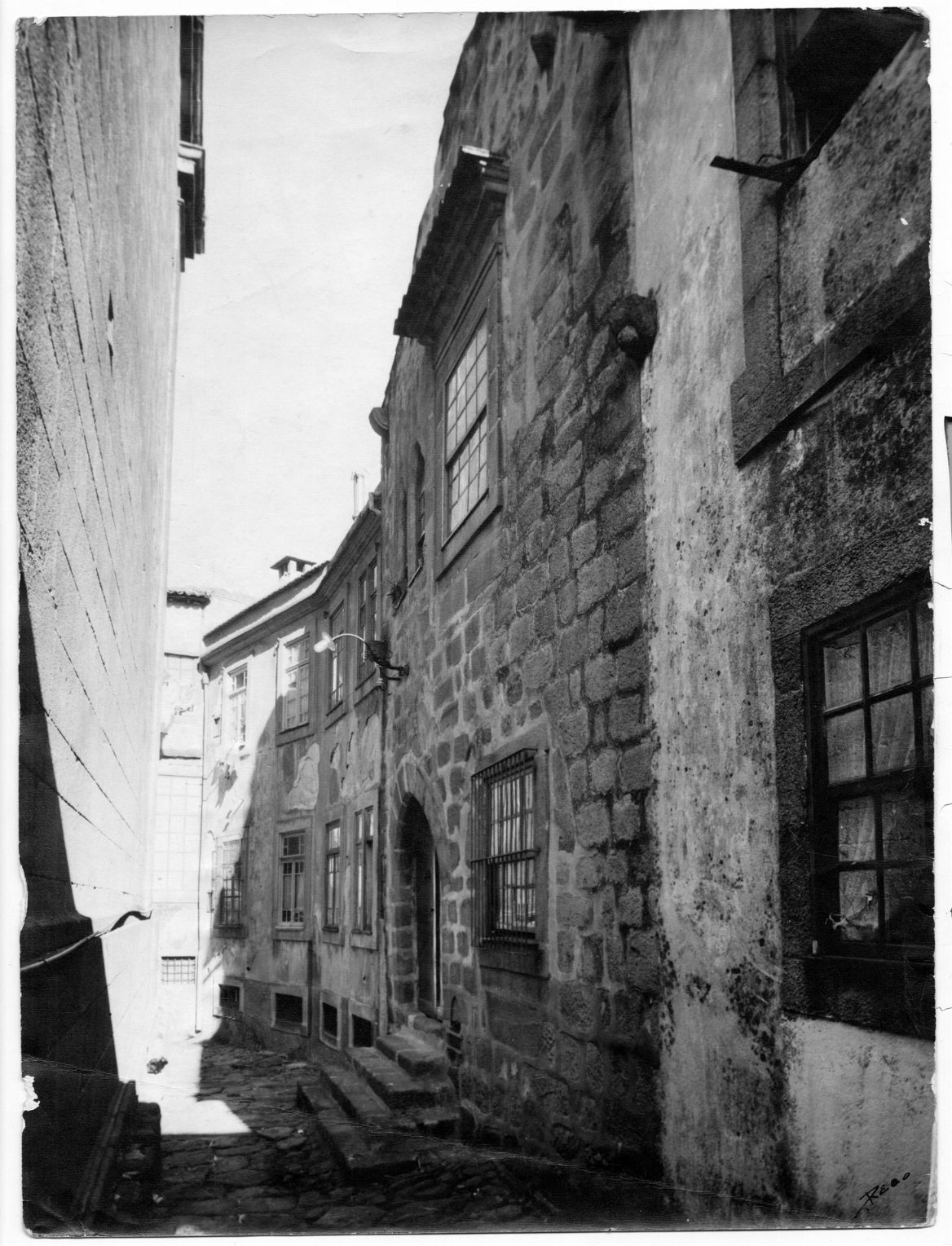
- Interactive map of the Residence of Beco dos Redemoinhos area

General information
- Type: Residence
- Location: Cedofeita, Santo Ildefonso, Sé, Miragaia, São Nicolau e Vitória, Porto, Portugal
- Coordinates: 41°8′34″N 8°36′38″W
- Opened: 14th century
- Owner: Portuguese Republic

Technical details
- Material: Reinforced granite

The Residence of Beco dos Redemoinhos (Portuguese: Casa do Beco dos Redemoinhos), is a 14th-century building situated in the Portugueses civil parish of Cedofeita, Santo Ildefonso, Sé, Miragaia, São Nicolau e Vitória, municipality of Porto.

== History ==
The building was likely constructed in the first half of the 14th century, as the principal residence of a wealthy merchant. The owner had obtained his inspiration from his business trips to northern Europe.

Owing to alterations to the Sé Cathedral of Porto, the building was reduced in size, at a time when the merchants of Porto were connected to the commercial enterprises in Flanders, France and England.

== Architecture ==
The long narrow building is located to the rear of the Sé Cathedral, but was reduced in size to the expansion of the main chapel.

The Flemish residence is marked by trilobe Gothic windows and the typical centralized chimney.
