= Fountain of the Lions =

Fountain of the Lions may refer to:

- Court of the Lions, a palace in the Alhambra, in Granada, Spain
- Fountain of the Lions (Porto), a fountain in São Nicolau e Vitória, Porto, Portugal

== See also ==
- Lions
