= Felgueiras Lighthouse =

Lighthouse in Portugal

Felgueiras Lighthouse Farolim de Felgueiras
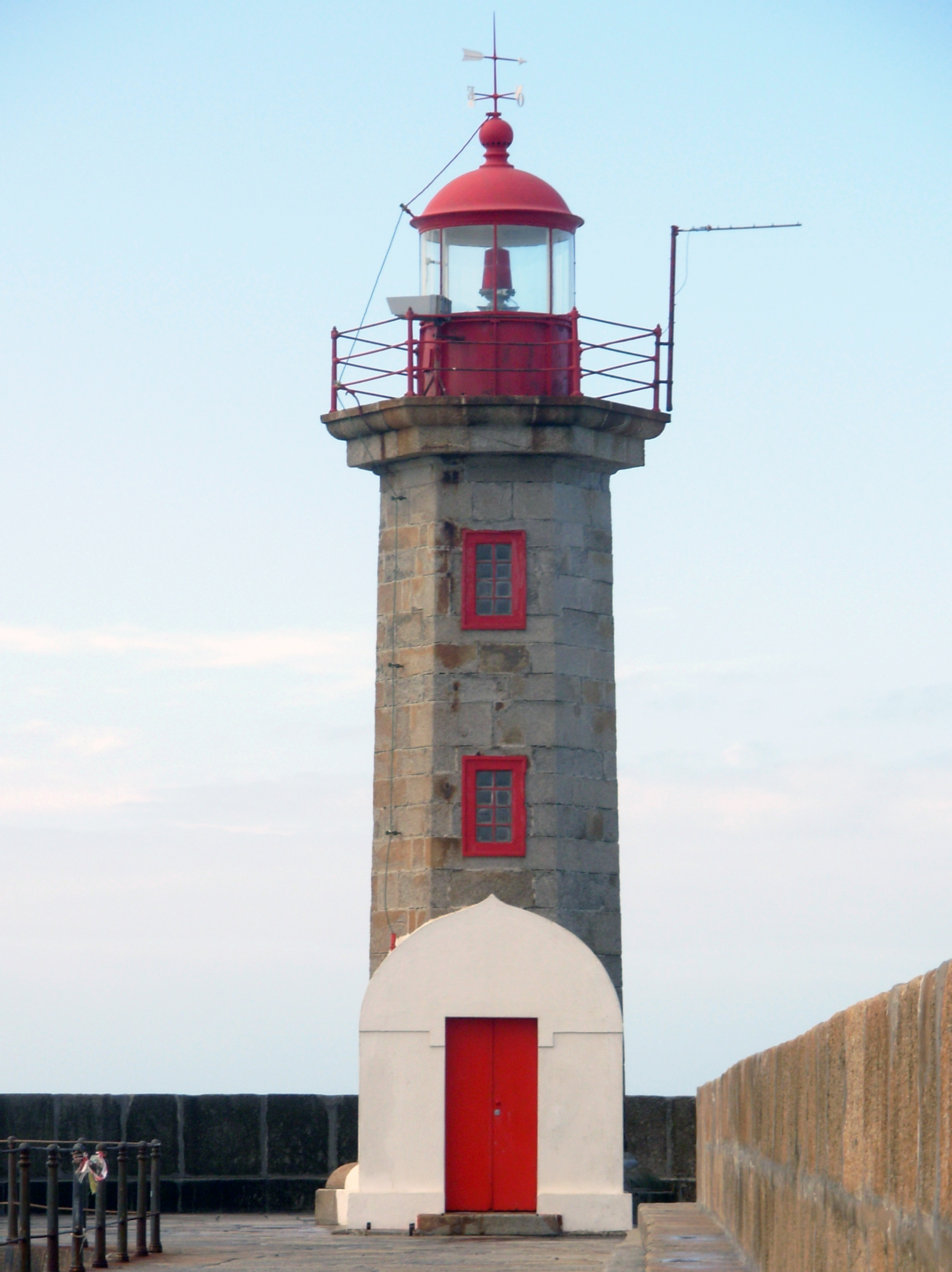
- Location: Foz do Douro, Aldoar, Foz do Douro e Nevogilde, Portugal
- Coordinates: 41°08′48″N 8°40′38″W

Tower
- Constructed: 1886
- Construction: stone
- Automated: 1979
- Height: 10 m (33 ft)
- Heritage: heritage without legal protection

Light
- Deactivated: 31 March 2009
- Focal height: 17 m (56 ft)
- Range: 9 nmi (17 km; 10 mi)
- Characteristic: Fl R 5s (–2009)

The Felgueiras Lighthouse (Portuguese: Farolim de Felgueiras), also known as the Farol de Felgueiras, Farolim do Molhe de Felgueiras, or Farolim Cabeça de Molhe, is a lighthouse on the Portuguese Atlantic coast, situated on a jetty or mole on the right bank of the Douro River, at the point where the river meets the ocean. It is situated in the parish of Foz do Douro, in the Porto municipality.

== History ==
Before the 19th century access to the city of Porto via the Douro River frequently presented problems, leading to several shipwrecks, because of the silting of the bar. To partially address this, construction work on a mole on the right bank of the river began in 1790. Further similar work was carried out in 1867.

The lighthouse was constructed in 1886 and fitted with a gas-fired incandescent light and a bell. In 1916, it was modified and further modifications were made in 1945. In 1955 it was fitted with a 2nd order lens with a red light, emitting a flash every five seconds and achieving a range of 9 nautical miles. Automation was introduced in 1979 and the Felgueiras Lighthouse was controlled remotely from the Leça Lighthouse, a few miles to the north.

The Felgueiras Lighthouse was deactivated on 31 March 2009, although the foghorn was retained. However, given its historical importance to both the city of Porto and the Portuguese Navy, which manages the country's lighthouses, it was decided to make it operational again and it was re-opened on 13 December 2021.

In 2024, the band Khruangbin released a song named after the lighthouse in their album A La Sala. The band was likely inspired by the Felgueiras lighthouse during their visit to Porto in 2022, when they performed in the music festival Primavera Sound Porto.

== Structure ==
The lighthouse consists of a 10-metre hexagonal tower of neoclassical design, in exposed granite masonry. It has a red balcony and lantern, and a small annex building with plastered walls painted white.

== See also ==
- List of lighthouses in Portugal
