= English Club of Porto =

- Antigo Clube dos Inglês
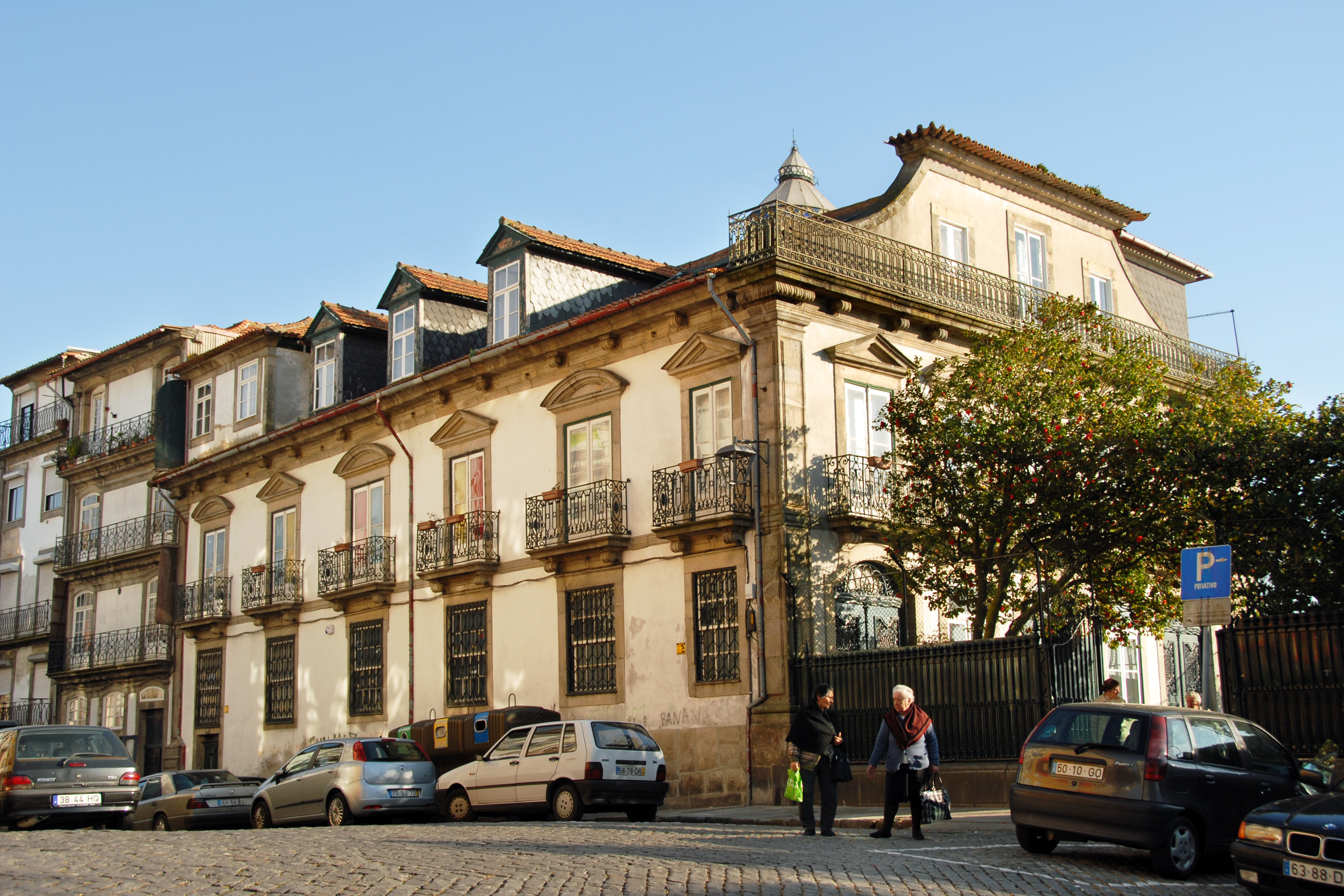
- The oblique view of the old 18th century English Club of Porto
- Interactive map of the English Club of Porto area

General information
- Type: Residence
- Location: Cedofeita, Santo Ildefonso, Sé, Miragaia, São Nicolau e Vitória, Portugal
- Coordinates: 41°8′36″N 8°37′5″W
- Opened: 14th century
- Owner: Portuguese Republic

Technical details
- Material: Reinforced granite

The English Club of Porto (Portuguese: Edifício na Rua das Virtudes/Clube dos Ingleses), is the name referring to the building along Rua das Virtudes, a 14th-century manorhouse situated in the Portugueses civil parish of Cedofeita, Santo Ildefonso, Sé, Miragaia, São Nicolau e Vitória, municipality of Porto.

== History ==
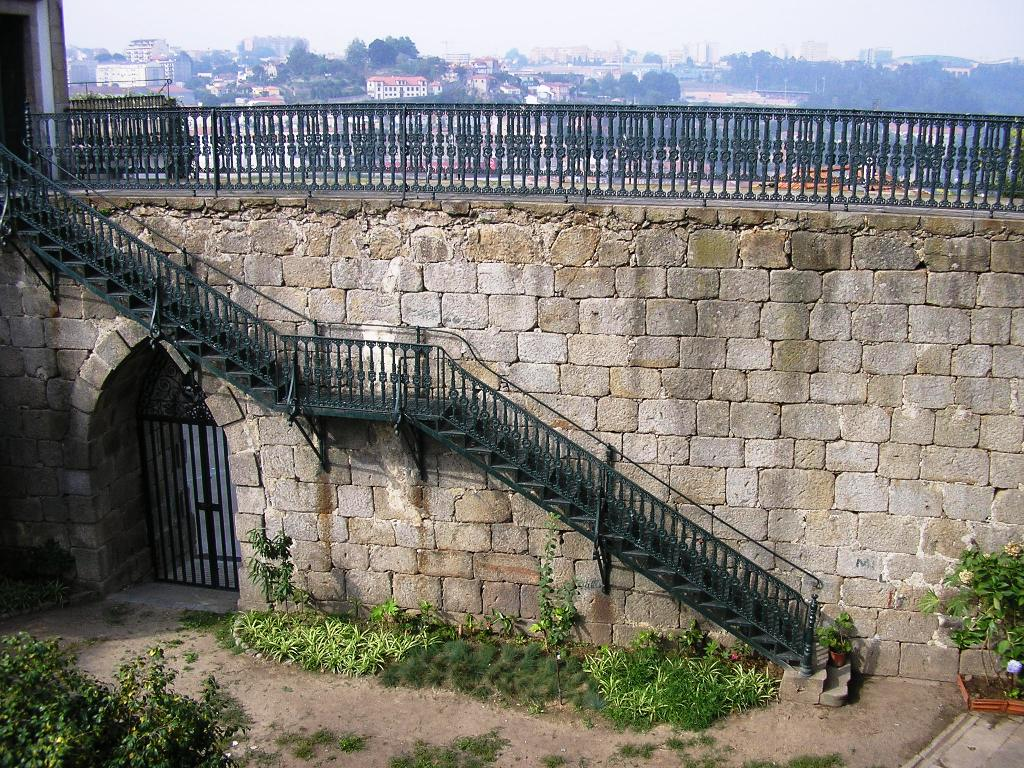
Partial aspect of the Fernandina Wall constructed alongside the building

From the writings of Horácio Marçal, it was in this building the Congregação de São Bernardo (Congregation of St. Bernard) installed a house of repose for curia of the Order of Malta. At the same time their Prosecutor-General had his residence in the building, and the terrace opened from the main facade. The building was integrated into the Fernandina wall, a section of wall 15 metres (49 ft) tall constructed in the 14th century.

The building was constructed between the 18th and 19th century. It was acquired in 1834 by Portuense merchant José Alexandre Ferreira Brandão.

In 1923, it was purchased from Brandão's descendants, and in 1925 the English Club was installed in the building.

Between 1992 and 1993, the interior was restores, along with the exterior facades and roofing, under the direction of the Serviços de Assistência da Ordem de Malta (Assistance Services of the Order of Malta).

== Architecture ==
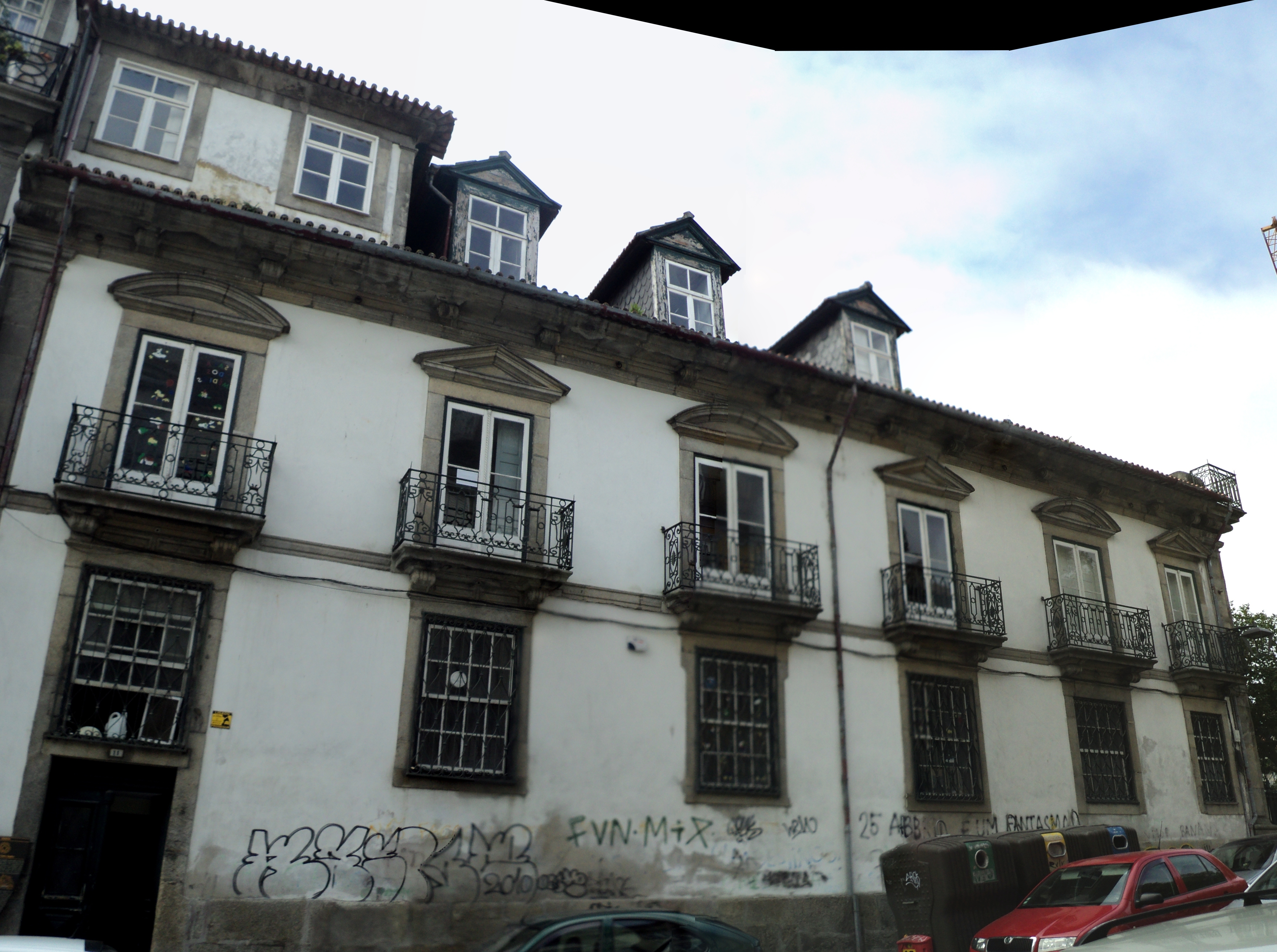
Lateral facade of the old English Club of Porto

The building is located in an urban context, situated in the historic centre of the city, in an area occupied by large buildings and residences that flank the structure.

The principal facade, facing the east, is a terrace with view to the Douro River.
