= Fountain of Rua das Taipas =

Fountain in Porto, Portugal

- Chafariz da 'Rua das Taipas'
- Medium: Granite Fountain
- Location: Porto, Portugal
- 41°8′35″N 8°37′4″W
- Owner: Câmara Municipal de Porto

The Fountain of Rua das Taipas (Portuguese: Chafariz da Rua das Taipas) is a fountain in the civil parish of Cedofeita, Santo Ildefonso, Sé, Miragaia, São Nicolau e Vitória, in the municipality of Porto, Portugal.

== History ==
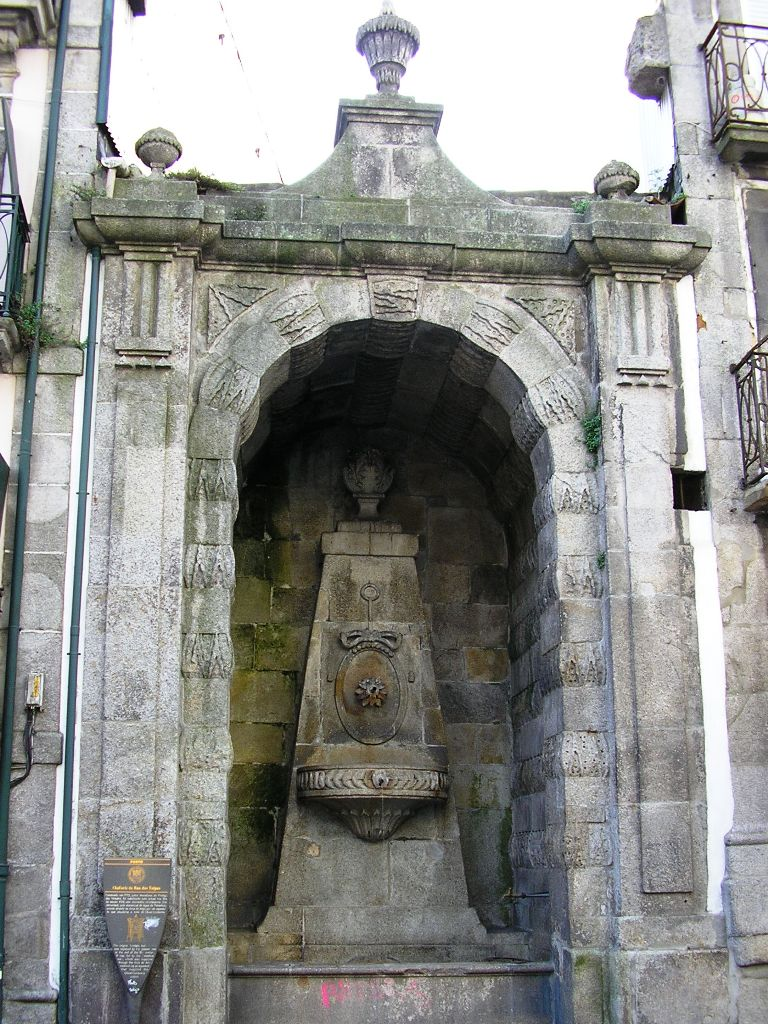
The fountain and its niche along Rua das Taipas

In 1772, the residents along the Largo do Postigo das Virtudes presented the municipal council with a request to construct a fountain.

Although there is no indication when the fountain was constructed or completed, by the end of the 18th century, there was already a need to substitute the pre-existing fountain with another.

== Architecture ==
The fountain is flanked by buildings along the Rua das Virtudes in the historic centre of Porto.

The granite fountain is part of a pyramidal obelisk decorated with a sphere recessed within a deep niche of rounded portico, flanked by pilasters. At the base of the obelisk is a tank and over that a semi-circular dish. On each of these elements (the obelisk and the semi-circular dish) are water spouts. The portico served as a shelter as much as a source of water. Over the entablature is a central column with plinth, surmounted by pinnacle. Much of the fountain is decorated with vegetal elements, but also includes a mirror-like circular element on the obelisk.
