= Fountain of the Virtues =

- Fonte das Virtudes
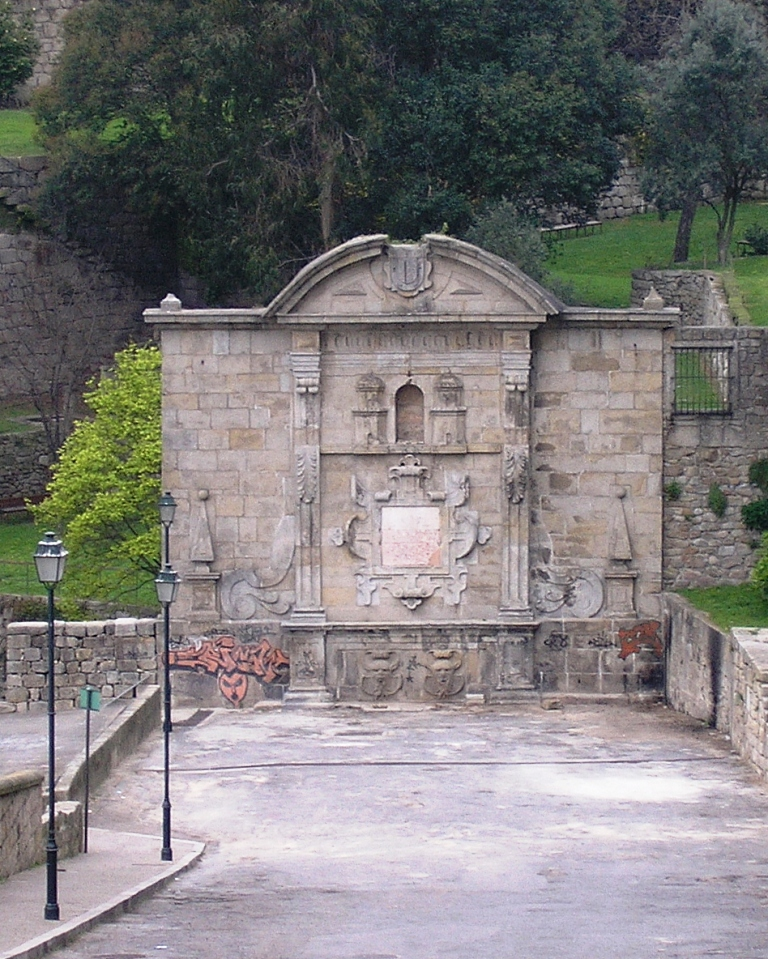
- Artist: Pantaleão de Seabra e Sousa
- Medium: Granite Fountain
- Movement: Baroque, Mannerism
- Subject: Senhora dos Virtudes
- Location: Porto, Portugal
- 41°8′41″N 8°31′8″W
- Owner: Câmara Municipal de Porto

The Fountain of the Virtues (Portuguese: Chafariz das Virtudes) is a fountain in the civil parish of Cedofeita, Santo Ildefonso, Sé, Miragaia, São Nicolau e Vitória, in the municipality of Porto.

== History ==
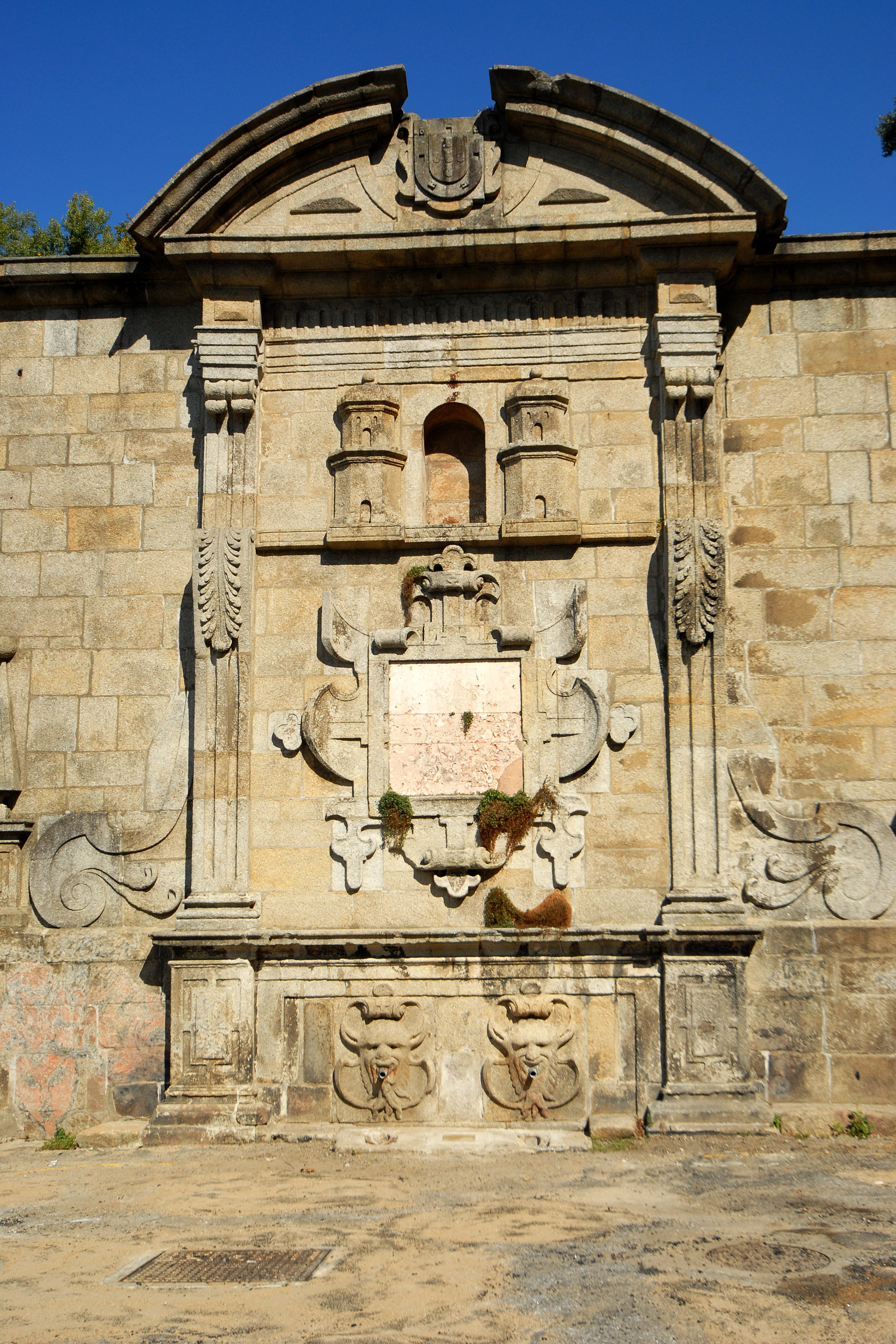
The main surface of the fountain, with Baroque elements

In 1619, the municipal council deliberated on the construction of a fountain for this area, which was designated as the Fonte do Rio Frio, owing to its location near the river. It was later changed to the fountain of Virtues, owing to its waters whose medicinal qualities were attributed to the Virgin Mary (in the invocation as Senhora das Virtudes) by local residents.

It would later be renamed, but its intent remained the same: the fountain would be used to link the waters of the various, dispersed mines that were not being used.

The fountain was constructed in an area occupied by the Jewish community, and specifically a cemetery.

At the time of its construction, the project was considered one of the more notable public works in the city at the time. Pantaleão de Seabra e Sousa, nobleman in the Royal House and regedor of the city (attributed to Father Manuel Pereira de Novais) designed the fountain, and the inscription was of the authorship of Germano Silva.

Initially, the fountain had stone bunks that flanked the tank and along the right side of the path, that were used by pedestrians during the 17th century.

The municipal council of Porto, through its Comissariado para a Recuperação Urbana da àrea da Ribeira Barredo (Ribeira Barredo Commission for Urban Recuperation), instituted a detailed plan for the integrated rehabilitation of the fountain and surrounding area.

== Architecture ==
The fountain is at the end of the calçada das Virtudes in the north, a grandioso support wall for the pedestrian Passeio das Virtudes, in the south and west, are the terraced estates that belong to the majorat manors and spring of Calçada das Virtudes.

It consists of a central, high backrest with two pilasters supporting a cornice and frontispiece interrupted by royal coat of arms. Between the fluted pilasters, is a lower cartouche with inscription, while the upper cartouche consists of two castles in high relief, one on either side of an edicule (where at one time there would have existed an image of the Virgin, in her invocation as Senhora dos Virtudes). This combination of imagery taken together represents the coat-of-arms of the city of Oporto. On each side of this set is an acrobatic pyramid attached to their respective pilasters by a scroll. The lower central part includes two frowning Renaissance faces from which are the water spouts.

The Latin inscription is inserted within a decorative rectangle in marble:

Fons scalet illustri virtutum nomine dictus: Qui sitit, has lymphas absque tomire bibat. Ante cavernoso de pumice degener ibat: Obstabant pigra limus et umbra mora. Publica conspicuas expensa duxit in auras, Utque loco flueret commodiore dedit. Inde viau stavit, dejecitque ordines se des, Gratiatam gratis maior ut esset aquis. Anno MDCXIX

Is a fountain of Scalea, the illustrious was given the name of virtues: He who is thirsty, has, without the volumes of the water 's edge to drink. Before the cavernous roof of a degenerate go barred inert clay and shadow time. The public, can be seen that he had paid, and brought him into the air, Just as she gave the place, might flow in a more comfortable. From this it is Viau up slowly, dejecitque inherent order, des, with greater grace, that it might be by the waters of its recipient. In the year 1619
