= Tower of D. Pedro Pitões =

Medieval fortification in Porto

- Torre de D. Pedro Pitões
- Porto, Grande Porto, Norte in Portugal
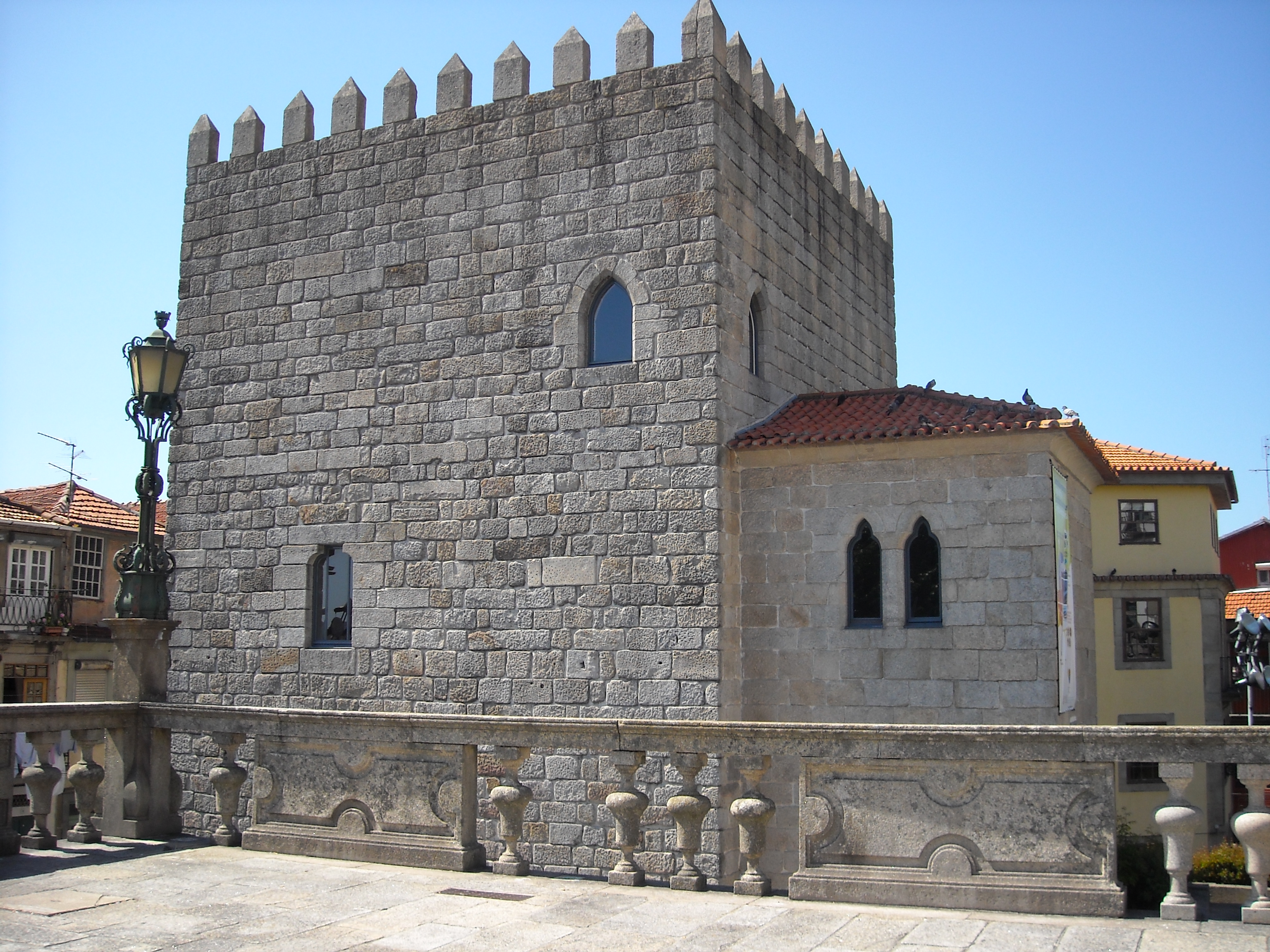
- The profile view of the medieval tower of D. Pedro Pitões

Site information
- Type: Fortification
- Owner: Portugal
- Operator: Câmara Municipal de Porto
- Open to the public: Private

Location
- Coordinates: 41°8′34″N 8°36′44″W

Site history
- Materials: Granite, Stucco, Iron, Zinco, Ceramic Tile, Wood

The Tower of D. Pedro Pitões (Portuguese: Torre de D. Pedro Pitões/Torre da Cidade) is a former-medieval fortification situated in the civil parish of Cedofeita, Santo Ildefonso, Sé, Miragaia, São Nicolau e Vitória, that protected the northern Portuguese city of Porto.

== History ==
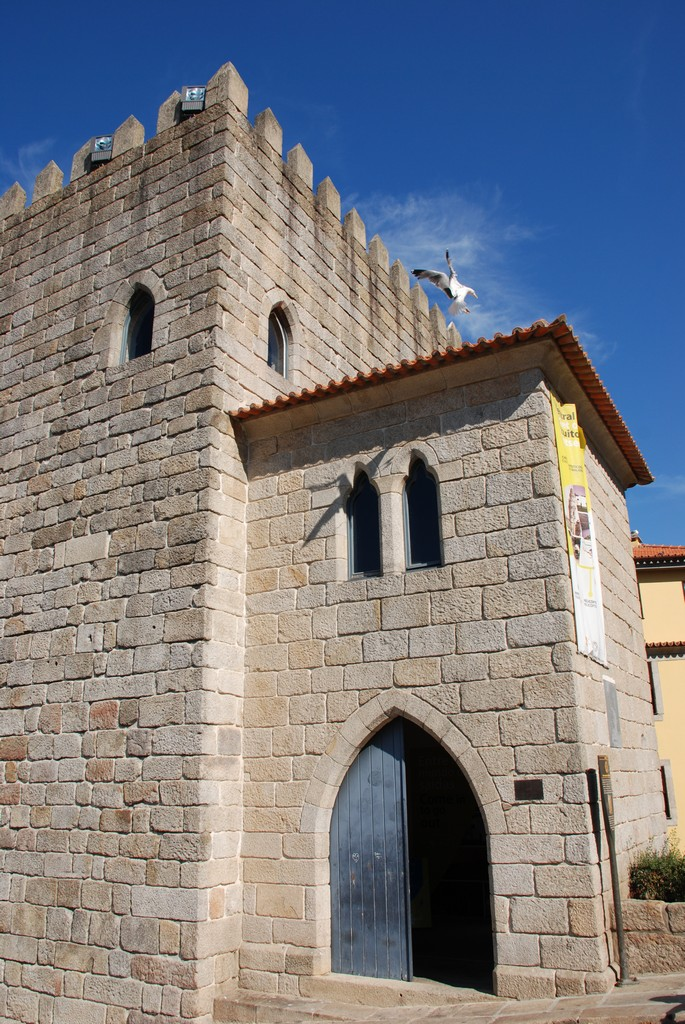
A view of the merlons and facade of the tower

The tower was "rediscovered" in 1940 in the Largo do Açougue during the course of the demolition of various buildings circling the Sé Cathedral of Porto, and was reconstructed near its original site.

Between 1940 and 1960, the Gabinete de História da Cidade (Porto History Cabinet) was installed in the building, resulting in its reference as the Torre da Cidade (City Tower).

In 1974, the building became the seat of the Centro Cultural e Social da Sé (Sé Social and Cultural Centre).

Architect Manuel Magalhães directed the rehabilitation of the tower in 1997, as part of the urban pilot project for the Bairro da Sé.

Following this, in 1998, a tourist post under the concession of Porto Tours was opened onsite, based on a protocol between the Associação de Turismo do Porto (Porto Tourism Association) and the Câmara Municipal do Porto.

== Architecture ==
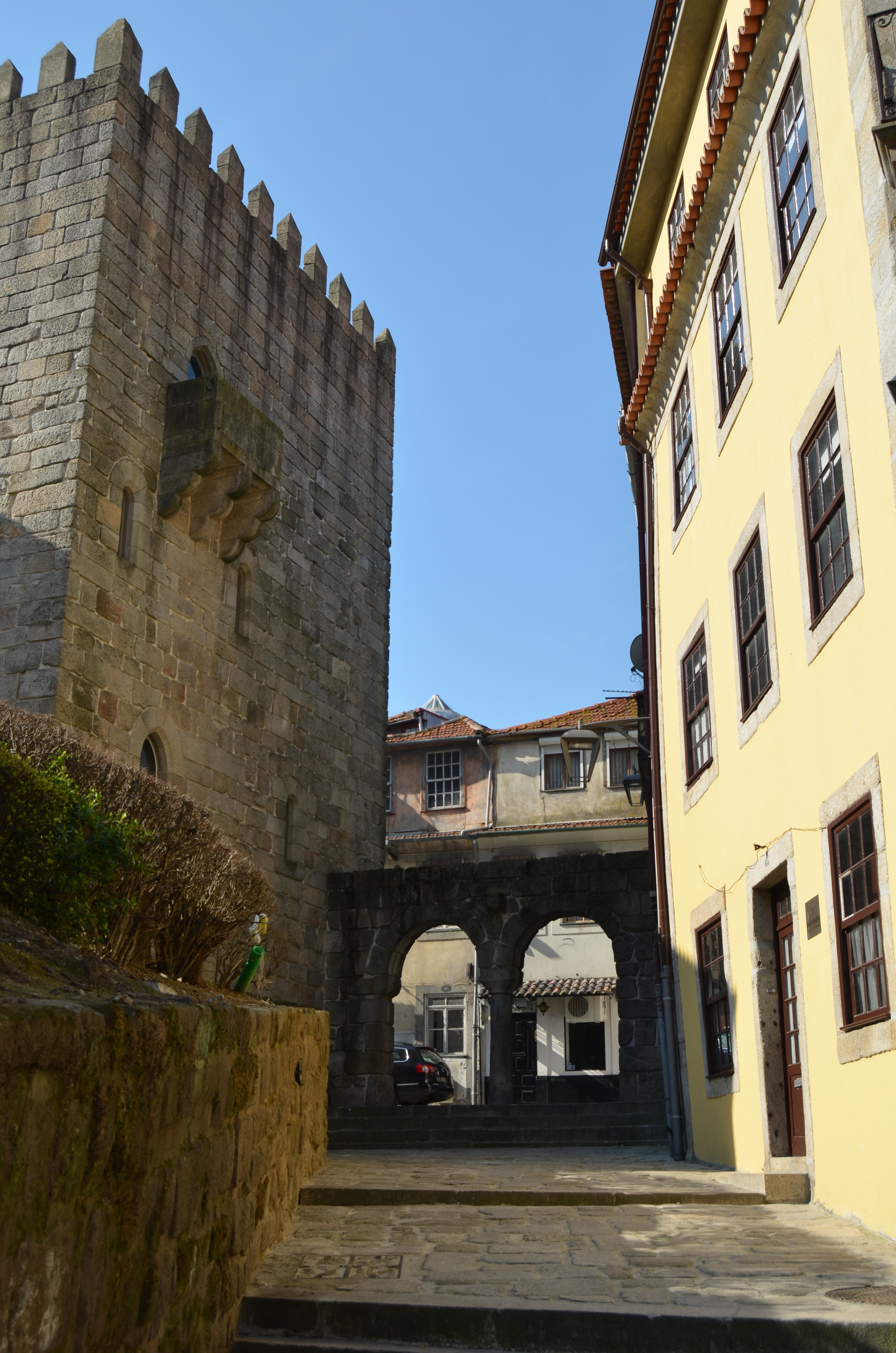
The addorsed archway between tower and buildings

The tower is situated in middle of the city, implanted on a slope. The principal facade is oriented to the Largo D. Pedro V', laterally to the access ramp of Terreiro da Sé. Perpendicular to the northern facade of the tower is a residential building, addorsed to it on the other side is the Arco de São Sebastião (St. Sebastian Arch), consisting of two arches with central column. To the north and west are residential and commercial buildings of three- to four-storeys, and to the east the group that includes the Sé Cathedral and Episcopal Palace.

The plan of the tower includes two rectangular volumes: an eastern two-storey and a western three-storey articulated volumes covered in roofing tile. Constructed in granite, the taller section is surmounted by triangular merlons, while the two-storey structure includes cornice over eaves. The southern principal facade has an access doorway with arch surmounted by twin trilobe windows and in the three storey section with dual lobe window on the second floor and a broken arch window on the third floor. The western facade has three friezes and plain arch on the first floor, a similar on the second and rectangular balcony supported by trilobal arch, serving a door third floor. The northern facade features a broken arched window and a perfect arch on the first floor, dual-arch windows on the second, and balcony similar to the western facade on the third. The eastern facade with perfect arch recess on the first floor of the shorter volume and broken arch window on the third floor of the highest volume.

The interior includes pavement slabs in granite on the ground floor and wood on the remain floors. The walls alternate between granite blocks and plastered and painted walls in white, while the ceilings are plastered and stuccos on the ground floor and decorated in wood frames on the remains levels. Access to the two volumes is made across ad arched doorway and truncated angular door on the second floor. In the taller volume, all the floors are covered by central pillar of granite; the access from the ground floor and the second follows a stone staircase, addorsed to the western wall. Between the second and third-floors the staircase is addorsed to the western wall, while between the second and third floors there is a steel staircase addorsed to the north.
