= Fountain of the Lions (Porto) =

19th-century fountain in Porto, Portugal

- Fonte dos Leões
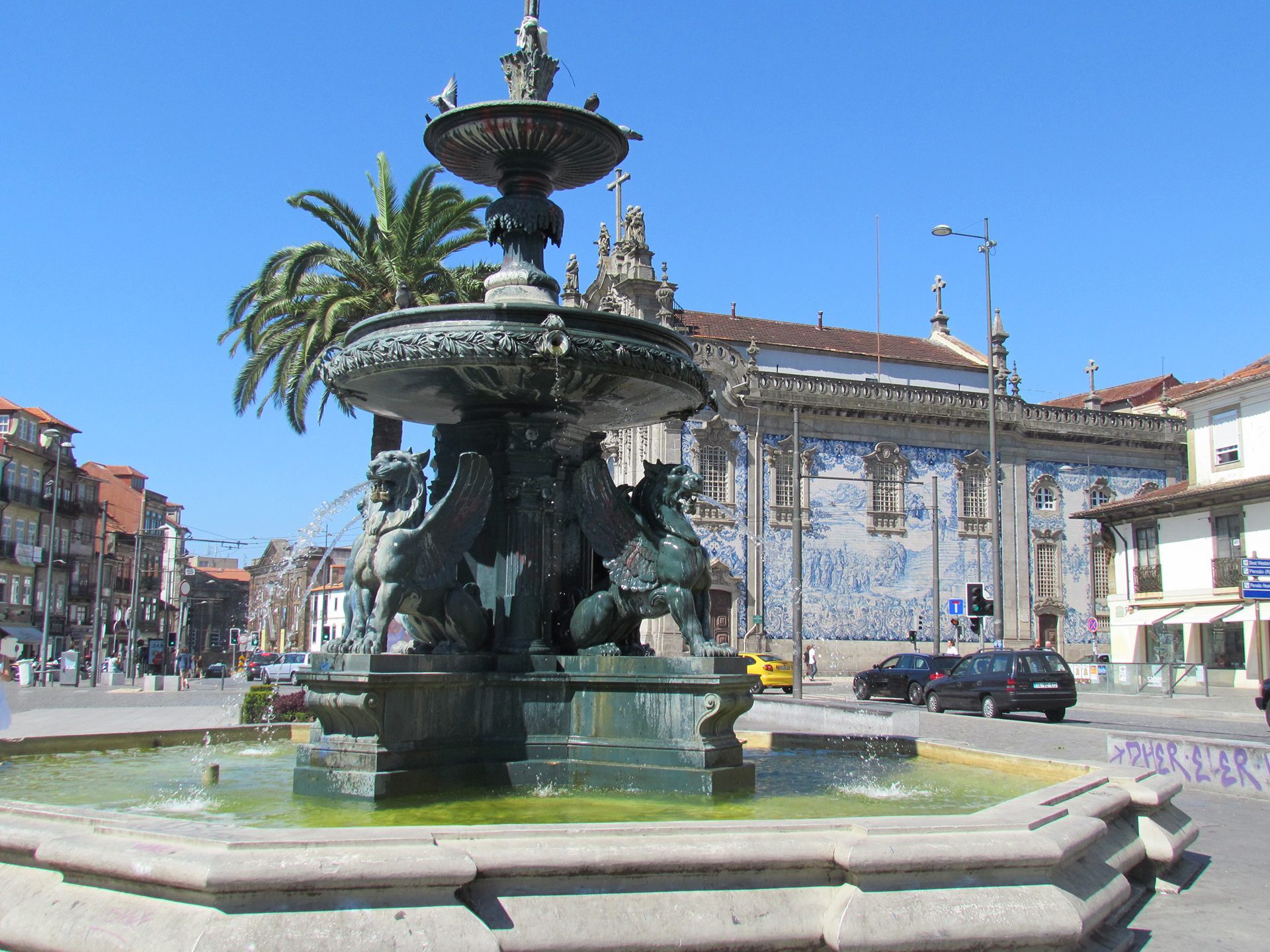
- A view of the fountain in the Praça de Parada Leitão
- Artist: Compagnie Générale des Eaux pour l'Etranger
- Medium: Marble
- Location: Porto, Portugal
- 41°8′50″N 8°36′56″W
- Owner: Câmara Municipal de Sintra

The Fountain of the Lions (Portuguese: Fonte dos Leões), is a 19th-century fountain built by French company Compagnie Générale des Eaux pour l'Etranger, in the civil parish of Cedofeita, Santo Ildefonso, Sé, Miragaia, São Nicolau e Vitória in municipality of Porto. Cast by the Val d’Osne foundry in France, it is a copy, in most part, of the fountain in the Town Hall Square of Leicester, England

== History ==
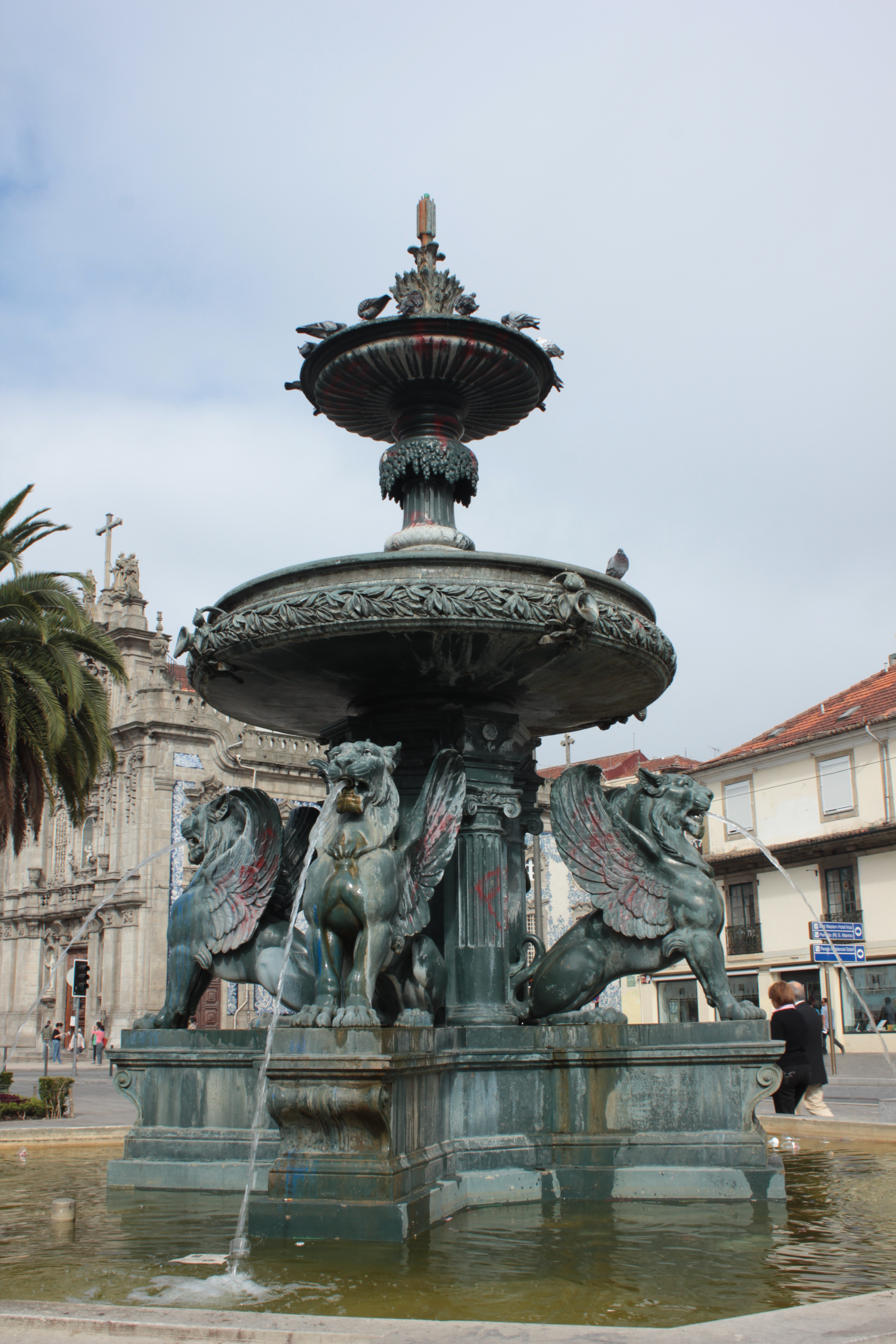
The Fountain of Lions

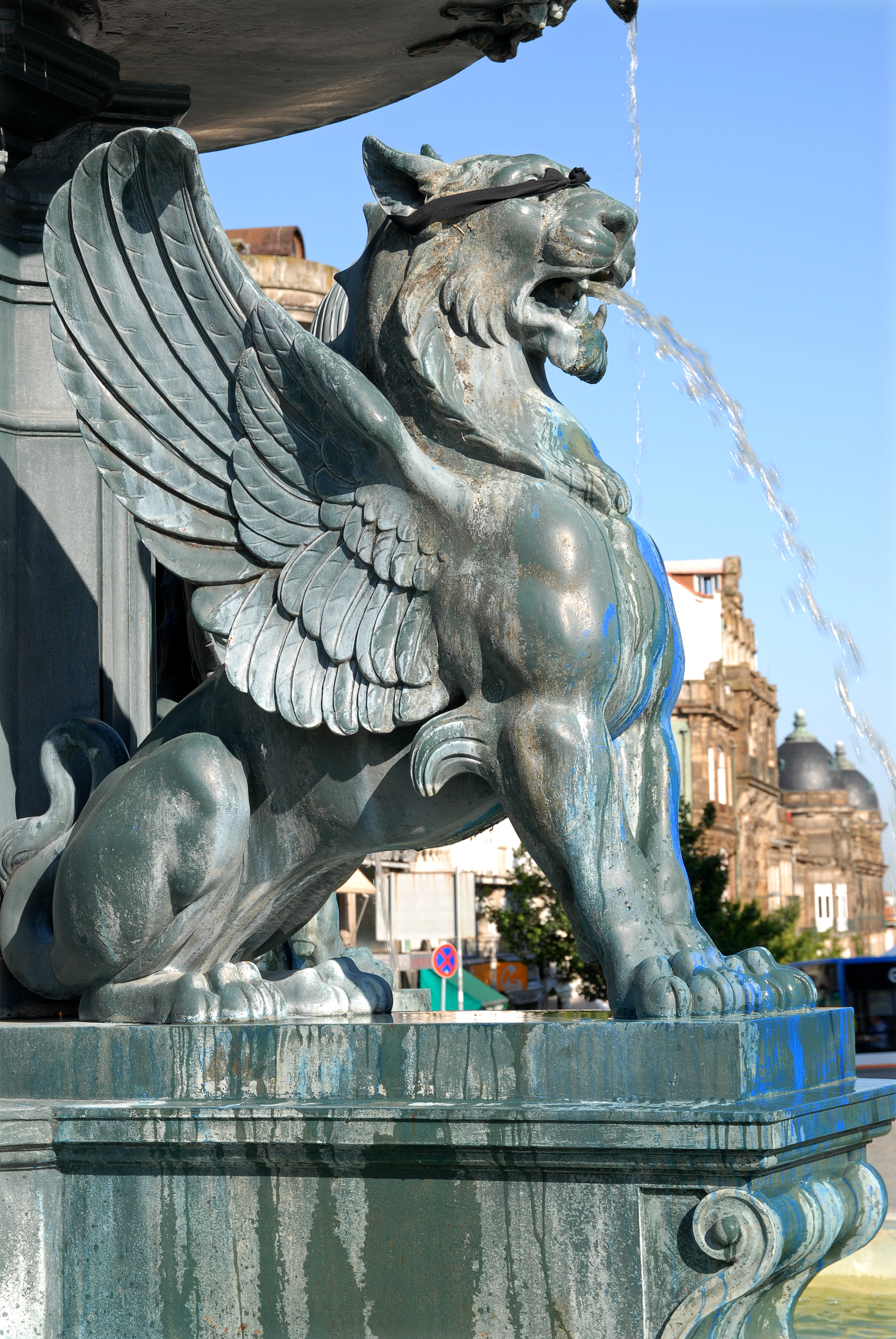
Detail of one of the sculptures of the winged lions

A competition was held in 1880, by the municipal water authority of Porto, under the direction of António Pinto de Magalhães (then president of Câmara Municipal of Porto). This resulted in an 1882 contract with the only submeter, the Compagnie Générale des Eaux pour l'Etranger. A decree was issued on 17 July 1882, which elaborated the and approved the provisional contract, which was promulgated on 27 July.

Work was initiated in 1883, to begin the supply of water to the city. This new project included a supply that included the design for the Lion fountain. On 30 August 1883, the design was rejected by the municipal commission, but on 13 August 1885, the municipal representatives approved the project sent by Carlos de Pezerat (4 July). Construction began on 25 September, and water began to flow as on 19 December 1886.

By 1 January 1887, the public water supply project for the city of Porto was concluded.

From 1942, the fountain was a less obligatory passage channels of the city, and began to be supplied by the Arca de Sá Noronha.

== Architecture ==
The fountain is located in an urban, isolated location, within the gardened Praça de Gomes Teixeira.

The central fountain has a cruciform layout with a group of sculptures at the base supported by four seated lions on the extremes. Between each lion, the axis of the source has a column with base, shaft and capital. To top, two central, circular cups superimposed and staggered, with a pine cone surmounting all. The octagonal shaped granite tank has rounded edges. The outer profile of the tank walls is corrugated. The edge of the lower plane bowl is outlined in relief by a frieze with plant elements interrupted only by four cornets from which water flows.
