= António da Silva Monteiro, 1st Count of Silva Monteiro =

António da Silva Monteiro
- Count of Silva Monteiro
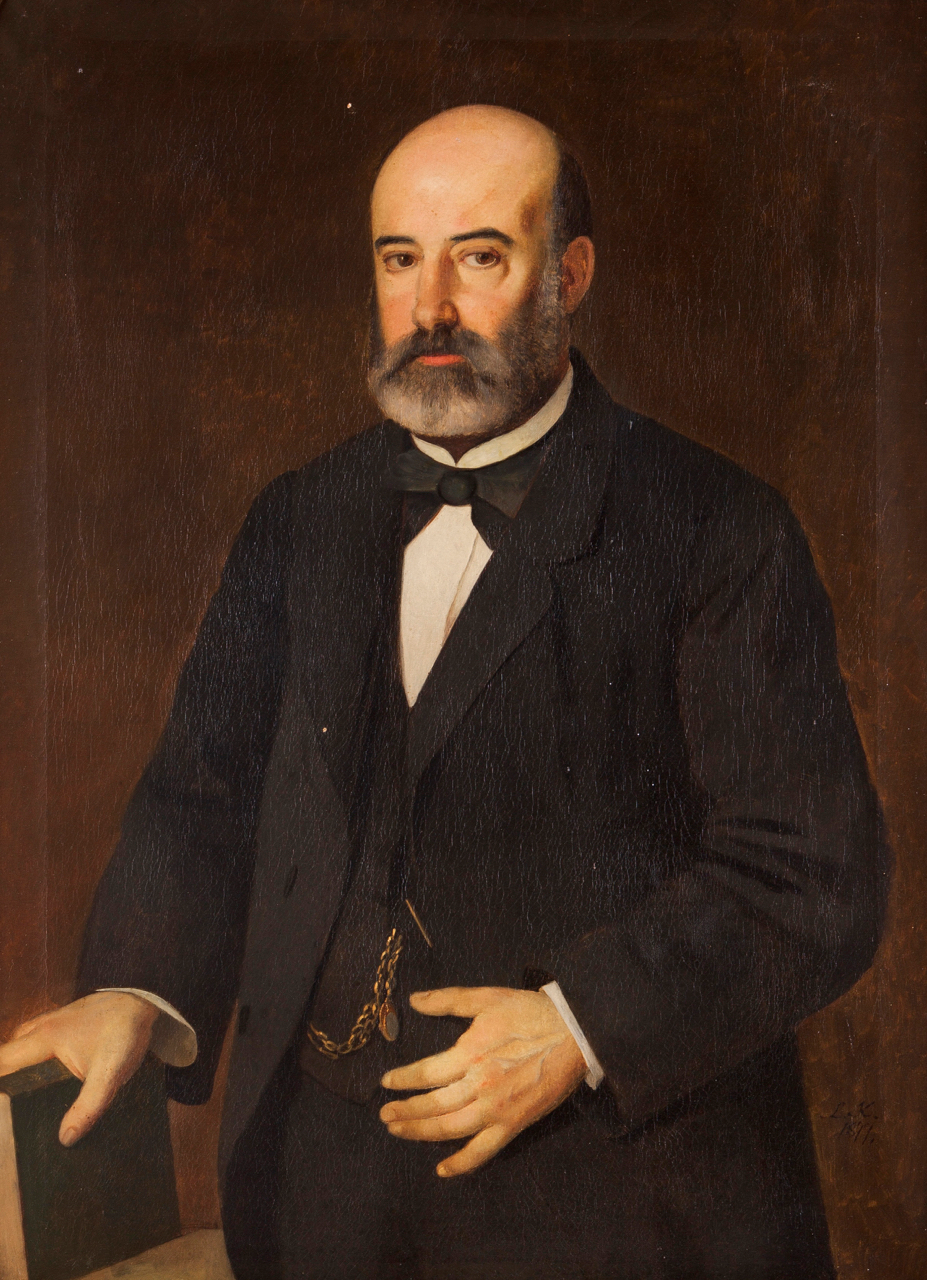

Count of Silva Monteiro
- Full name: António da Silva Monteiro
- Born: 16 August 1822; Lordelo do Ouro, Porto
- Died: 15 January 1885 (aged 62)
- Noble family: da Silva Monteiro

António da Silva Monteiro, 1st Count of Silva Monteiro (August 16, 1822 – January 15, 1885) was a Portuguese nobleman.

== Life ==
Monteiro was born in 1822 to entrepreneur parents. As a young man, he emigrated to Rio de Janeiro. Here, he would later become a prominent businessman and the owner of a major trading house, which was still thriving at the time of his death.

He received the title of Count of Silva Monteiro on December 22, 1875, by decree of King Luis I of Portugal.

He was a Knight of the Royal House and Commander of the Order of the Immaculate Conception of Vila Viçosa.

He died of hepatitis on January 15, 1885. His death was mourned by the Portuguese royal family and many people of different social classes.

== Sources ==
- Manuel M. Rodrigues - O Occidente: Revista Illustrada de Portugal e do Extrangeiro - 1 February 1885 - Volume VIII - n° 220 - page: 25/26.
