= Sé (Porto) =

- Civil parish
- Coordinates: 41.144°N 8.607°W
- Country: Portugal
- Region: Norte
- Metropolitan area: Metropolitan Area of Porto
- District: Porto
- Municipality: Porto
- Disbanded: 2013

Area
  - Total: 0.49 km^{2} (0.19 sq mi)

Population (2011)
  - Total: 3,460
  - Density: 7,100/km^{2} (18,000/sq mi)
- Time zone: UTC+00:00 (WET)
  - Summer (DST): UTC+01:00 (WEST)

Sé (Portuguese pronunciation: [sɛ]) is a former civil parish in the municipality of Porto, Portugal. In 2013, the parish merged into the new parish Cedofeita, Santo Ildefonso, Sé, Miragaia, São Nicolau e Vitória. The population in 2011 was 3,460, in an area of 0.49 km².

Sé is one of the four districts within the UNESCO World Heritage Classified Zone of Porto, the others being São Nicolau, Vitória, and Miragaia.

Local landmarks include Porto Cathedral (which gave the name to the parish), Church of Santa Clara, several chapels and episcopal buildings. It is also the location of the major São Bento train station.

== Gallery ==
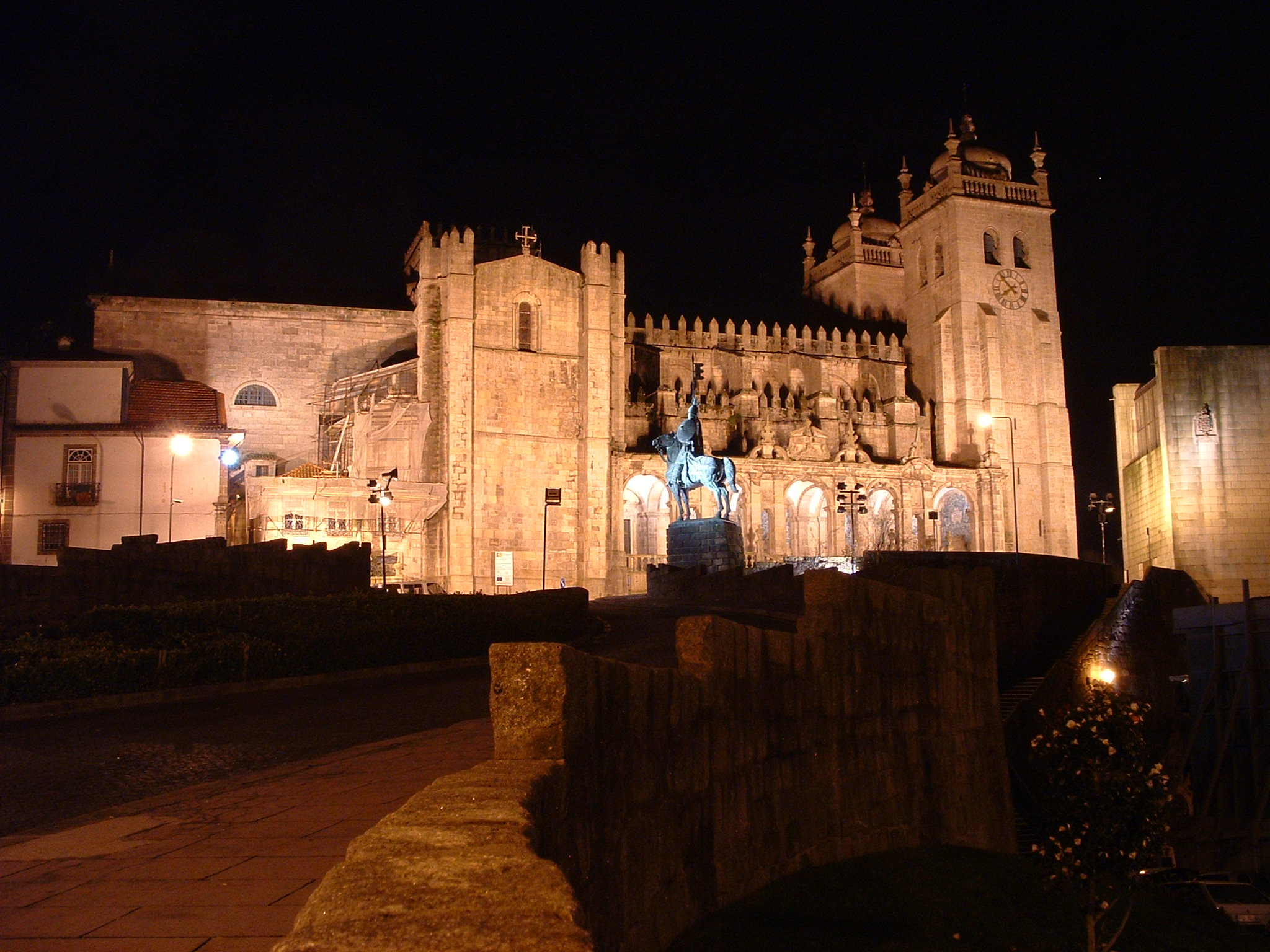
Porto Cathedral

Hall of the São Bento station
