= Fernando Gomes (Portuguese politician) =

Portuguese politician (born 1946)

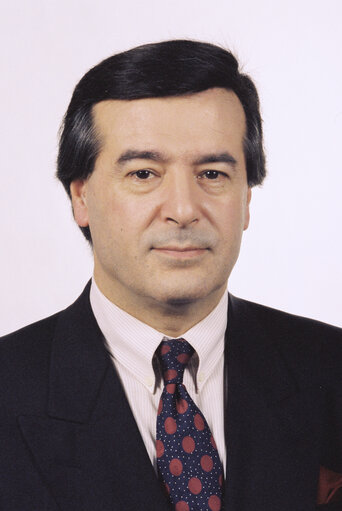
Fernando Gomes in 1989

Fernando Manuel dos Santos Gomes (born 13 April 1946) is a Portuguese politician who served as Mayor of Porto from 1989 until 1999, and as Minister Adjunct and of Internal Administration from 1999 until 2000.

== Biography ==
Fernando Gomes was born in Vila do Conde in 1946. He studied Economics in the University of Porto.

In 1974, following the Carnation Revolution, he joined the Socialist Party and was later appointed as Mayor of Vila do Conde, being elected in the 1976 local elections, staying in office until 1981.

He was first elected to the Assembly of the Republic in the 1980 legislative election. He was appointed as Secretary of State for Housing and Urbanism in 1983 under Mário Soares' Central Bloc government. In 1986 he became a Member of the European Parliament, serving until 1993.

In the 1989 local election he was first elected as Mayor of Porto, later being reelected in 1993 and 1997. During his time in office, the city developed significantly, with initiatives like the European Capital of Culture bringing several innovations such as the Porto Metro, the Parque da Cidade and the classification of the Historic Center as a UNESCO World Heritage site.

Gomes resigned as Mayor in 1999 after being invited to become Minister Adjunct and of Internal Administration under the government of António Guterres. He resigned shortly after taking office in order to run again for Mayor of Porto in the 2001 local election, but he ended up being defeated by Rui Rio. Afterwards, he returned to Parliament until 2005, when he left politics.
