= Aldoar, Foz do Douro e Nevogilde =

- Civil parish
- Location in Portugal
- Coordinates: 41.171°N 8.671°W
- Country: Portugal
- Region: Norte
- Metropolitan area: Porto
- District: Porto
- Municipality: Porto

Area
  - Total: 6.27 km^{2} (2.42 sq mi)

Population (2011)
  - Total: 28,858
  - Density: 4,600/km^{2} (11,900/sq mi)
- Time zone: UTC+00:00 (WET)
  - Summer (DST): UTC+01:00 (WEST)

Aldoar, Foz do Douro e Nevogilde is a civil parish in the municipality of Porto, Portugal. It was formed in 2013 by the merger of the former parishes Aldoar, Foz do Douro and Nevogilde. The population in 2011 was 28,858, in an area of 6.27 km^{2} (2.42 sq mi).
