= Lordelo do Ouro =

- Civil parish
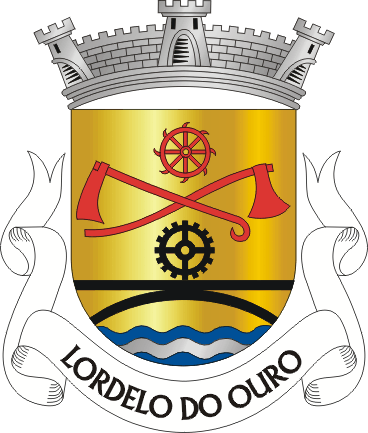
- Coat of arms

- Coordinates: 41.160°N 8.658°W
- Country: Portugal
- Region: Norte
- Metropolitan area: Metropolitan Area of Porto
- District: Porto
- Municipality: Porto
- Disbanded: 2013

Area
  - Total: 3.64 km^{2} (1.41 sq mi)

Population (2011)
  - Total: 22,270
  - Density: 6,100/km^{2} (16,000/sq mi)
- Time zone: UTC+00:00 (WET)
  - Summer (DST): UTC+01:00 (WEST)
- Website: http://www.lordelo.net/

Lordelo do Ouro (Portuguese pronunciation: [loɾˈðelu ðu ˈoɾu]) is a former civil parish in the municipality of Porto, Portugal. In 2013, the parish merged into the new parish Lordelo do Ouro e Massarelos. The population in 2011 was 22,270, in an area of 3.64 km^{2}. It overlooks the Douro river.

Local landmarks include the São Martinho de Lordelo Church, the Serralves park and modern art museum, along with other modern architecture buildings. The church is very important to the local inhabitants and services are still held there.

== History ==
The coat of arms tells the story of this riverside parish of Porto: the gold, the Arrábida Bridge, the farms and industry, and the wheel of St. Catherine.

Lordelo do Ouro ("lordship of gold") got its name from the shipments of gold (ouro) arriving from the colonies in Africa and Brazil during the times of the Portuguese Empire.

It is a small parish by the river, where the shipyards built many of the "naus" used by the Portuguese, first to break the Siege of Lisbon by the Castilians during the 1383-1385 Crisis which recognised John the Master of Aviz as the King of Portugal, and later as the first fleet on the Conquest of Ceuta (North Africa) by King John I. It is said that the typical local dish known as tripas à moda do Porto was created in 1415 in Porto when the inhabitants provided the ships built in the shipyard of Lordelo do Ouro and used on the conquest of Ceuta with everything they had in the city, offering all the clean meat to those who would sail to the African coast, and being left behind with only the innards of the animals, the offal. The riverside area has been renewed during Porto 2001 Culture Capital, but the smallish shipyards remain as Historical memories. On the hill top, the small Santa Catarina chapel still retains the inscription of its foundation in 1395, one year after the birth of Henry the Navigator, son of King John I, on the nearby Ribeira.

The fashion of sea bathing during the 19th century caused the expansion of the city of Porto to the sea coast to the West, expanding the parish of Foz do Douro as a paradise for wealthy people. This development continued and was reinforced during the 20th century, especially after the Arrábida bridge was built in the 60's, increasing traffic and facilitating access to the westernmost part of Porto. Thus, Lordelo do Ouro was kept as a pristine parish with acres of cultivated land and shrubs forgotten between Foz to the West and the center of Porto to the East, until after the revolution.

In the end of the 20th century, especially after the Carnation Revolution in 1974, the parish has changed a lot. All the acres of land were used to build new housing, especial for social purposes. Social housing ("bairros sociais" or "bairros camarários") was common during the Estado Novo regime (1933–1974) led by António de Oliveira Salazar and later Marcelo Caetano, but the revolution expanded it to a larger scale.

== Sights ==
The chapel of Santa Catarina provides a glance over the ocean, the southern margin of Gaia, the bridge of Arrábida, and the remaining patches of green. Nearby, the church of Lordelo still rings its bells every hour. The Bessa Stadium (from Boavista Futebol Club), the former northern border of the parish, is no longer part of the parish, but the Botanical Garden marks the eastern border while the parish extends towards Foz to the West. The garden of Calém keeps a statue celebrating the fleet of the conquest of Ceuta, and sometimes flocks of migrating birds stop for a rest on the river boulders in front of the garden. The Museu Serralves is probably the most famous cultural spot of the parish.

== Notable people ==
- António da Silva Monteiro, 1st Count of Silva Monteiro (1822–1885), Portuguese nobleman
