= Aldoar =

- Civil parish
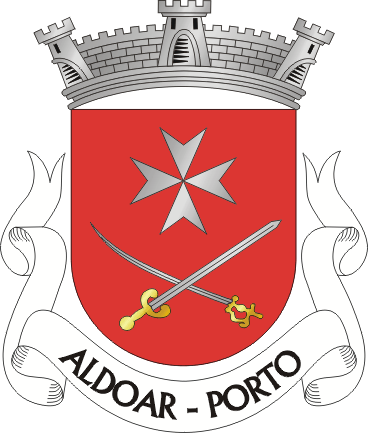
- Coat of arms

- Coordinates: 41.171°N 8.671°W
- Country: Portugal
- Region: Norte
- Metropolitan area: Metropolitan Area of Porto
- District: Porto
- Municipality: Porto
- Disbanded: 2013

Area
  - Total: 2.41 km^{2} (0.93 sq mi)

Population (2011)
  - Total: 12,843
  - Density: 5,300/km^{2} (14,000/sq mi)
- Time zone: UTC+00:00 (WET)
  - Summer (DST): UTC+01:00 (WEST)
- Website: http://www.jf-aldoar.pt/

Aldoar (Portuguese pronunciation: [alduˈaɾ]) is a former civil parish in the municipality of Porto, Portugal. In 2013, the parish merged into the new parish Aldoar, Foz do Douro e Nevogilde. The population in 2011 was 12,843, in an area of 2.41 km².
