= Nevogilde (Porto) =

- Civil parish
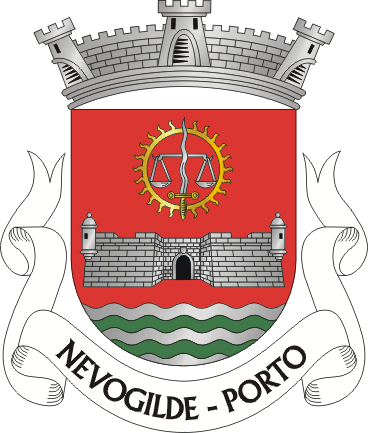
- Coat of arms

- Coordinates: 41.271°N 8.324°W
- Country: Portugal
- Region: Norte
- Metropolitan area: Metropolitan Area of Porto
- District: Porto
- Municipality: Porto
- Disbanded: 2013

Area
  - Total: 1.84 km^{2} (0.71 sq mi)

Population (2011)
  - Total: 5,018
  - Density: 2,700/km^{2} (7,100/sq mi)
- Time zone: UTC+00:00 (WET)
  - Summer (DST): UTC+01:00 (WEST)

Nevogilde (Portuguese pronunciation: [nɨvuˈʒildɨ]) is a former civil parish in the municipality of Porto, Portugal. In 2013, the parish merged into the new parish Aldoar, Foz do Douro e Nevogilde. The population in 2011 was 5,018, in an area of 1.84 km^{2}.
