= Vitória (Porto) =

- Civil parish
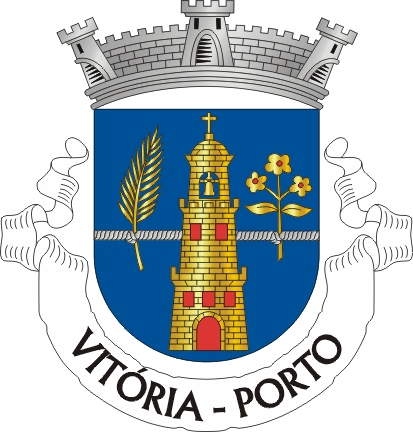
- Coat of arms

- Coordinates: 41.149°N 8.616°W
- Country: Portugal
- Region: Norte
- Metropolitan area: Metropolitan Area of Porto
- District: Porto
- Municipality: Porto
- Disbanded: 2013

Area
  - Total: 0.33 km^{2} (0.13 sq mi)

Population (2011)
  - Total: 1,901
  - Density: 5,800/km^{2} (15,000/sq mi)
- Time zone: UTC+00:00 (WET)
  - Summer (DST): UTC+01:00 (WEST)

Vitória (Portuguese pronunciation: [viˈtɔɾiɐ]) is a former civil parish in the municipality of Porto, Portugal. In 2013, the parish merged into the new parish Cedofeita, Santo Ildefonso, Sé, Miragaia, São Nicolau e Vitória. The population in 2011 was 1,901, in an area of 0.33 km^{2}.

Vitória is one of the four districts within the UNESCO World Heritage Classified Zone of Porto, the others being São Nicolau, Sé, and Miragaia. A major landmark of Vitória is the Clérigos Tower ("Torre dos Clérigos"). The Vitória district is bounded by the Cedofeita, Santo Ildefonso, São Nicolau, Sé, and Miragaia districts.
