= Foz do Douro =

- Civil parish
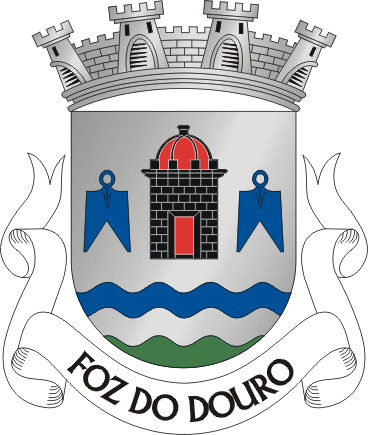
- Coat of arms

- Coordinates: 41.150°N 8.667°W
- Country: Portugal
- Region: Norte
- Metropolitan area: Porto
- District: Porto
- Municipality: Porto
- Disbanded: 2013

Area
  - Total: 1.88 km^{2} (0.73 sq mi)

Population (2011)
  - Total: 10,997
  - Density: 5,800/km^{2} (15,000/sq mi)
- Time zone: UTC+00:00 (WET)
  - Summer (DST): UTC+01:00 (WEST)

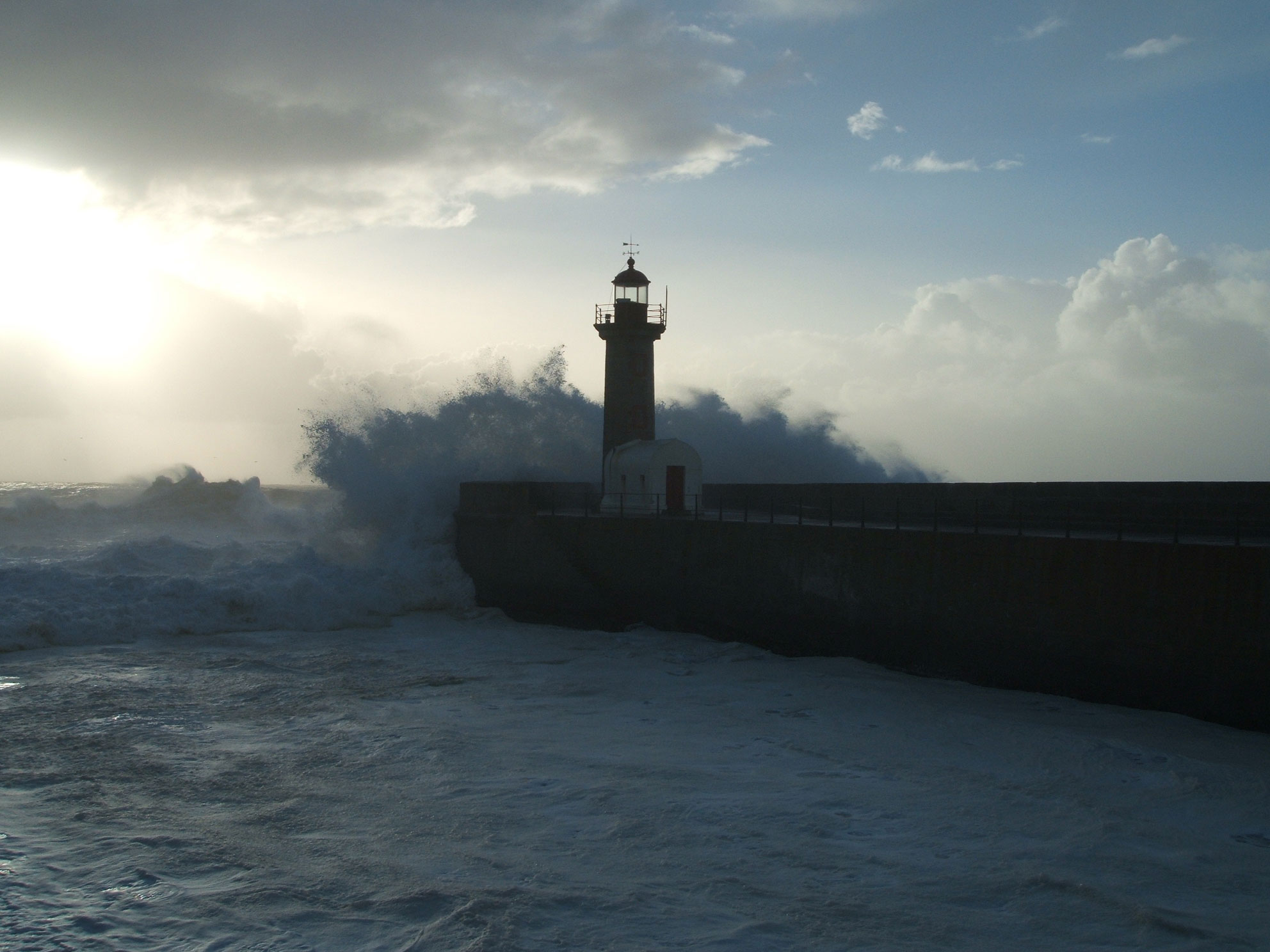
The Felgueiras Lighthouse is situated at the edge of the mouth of the river Douro and the Atlantic coastline of Foz do Douro

Foz do Douro (Portuguese pronunciation: [ˈfɔʒ ðu ˈðo(w)ɾu]; meaning "Mouth of the Douro") is a former civil parish in the municipality of Porto, Portugal. In 2013, the parish merged into the new parish Aldoar, Foz do Douro e Nevogilde. The population in 2011 was 10,997, in an area of 1.88 km^{2}. It became a parish in 1836. It is located in the western part of Porto, next to the mouth of the Douro river and the Atlantic Ocean.

== History ==
The first king of Portugal, Afonso Henriques, donated a chapel in São João da Foz in 1145. In the 13th century the chapel became part of the Benedictine monastery of Santo Tirso. The borders of the parish, called Couto da Foz, were limited by the city of Bouças (Matosinhos) in the north and Porto, to the east.
