= São Nicolau, Porto =

São Nicolau
- Civil parish
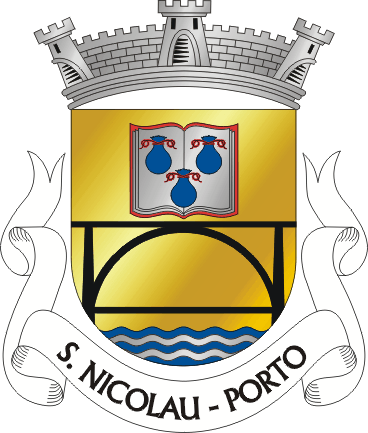
- Coat of arms

- Coordinates: 41.189°N 8.144°W
- Country: Portugal
- Region: Norte
- Metropolitan area: Metropolitan Area of Porto
- District: Porto
- Municipality: Porto
- Disbanded: 2013

Area
  - Total: 0.25 km^{2} (0.10 sq mi)

Population (2011)
  - Total: 1,906
  - Density: 7,600/km^{2} (20,000/sq mi)
- Time zone: UTC+00:00 (WET)
  - Summer (DST): UTC+01:00 (WEST)

São Nicolau (Portuguese pronunciation: [sɐ̃w nikuˈlaw]) is a former civil parish in the municipality of Porto, Portugal. In 2013, the parish merged into the new parish Cedofeita, Santo Ildefonso, Sé, Miragaia, São Nicolau e Vitória. The population in 2011 was 1,906, in an area of 0.25 km^{2}.
