= Cedofeita, Santo Ildefonso, Sé, Miragaia, São Nicolau e Vitória =

- Civil parish
- Location in Portugal
- Coordinates: 41.156°N 8.623°W
- Country: Portugal
- Region: Norte
- Metropolitan area: Porto
- District: Porto
- Municipality: Porto

Area
  - Total: 5.43 km^{2} (2.10 sq mi)

Population (2011)
  - Total: 40,440
  - Density: 7,450/km^{2} (19,300/sq mi)
- Time zone: UTC+00:00 (WET)
  - Summer (DST): UTC+01:00 (WEST)

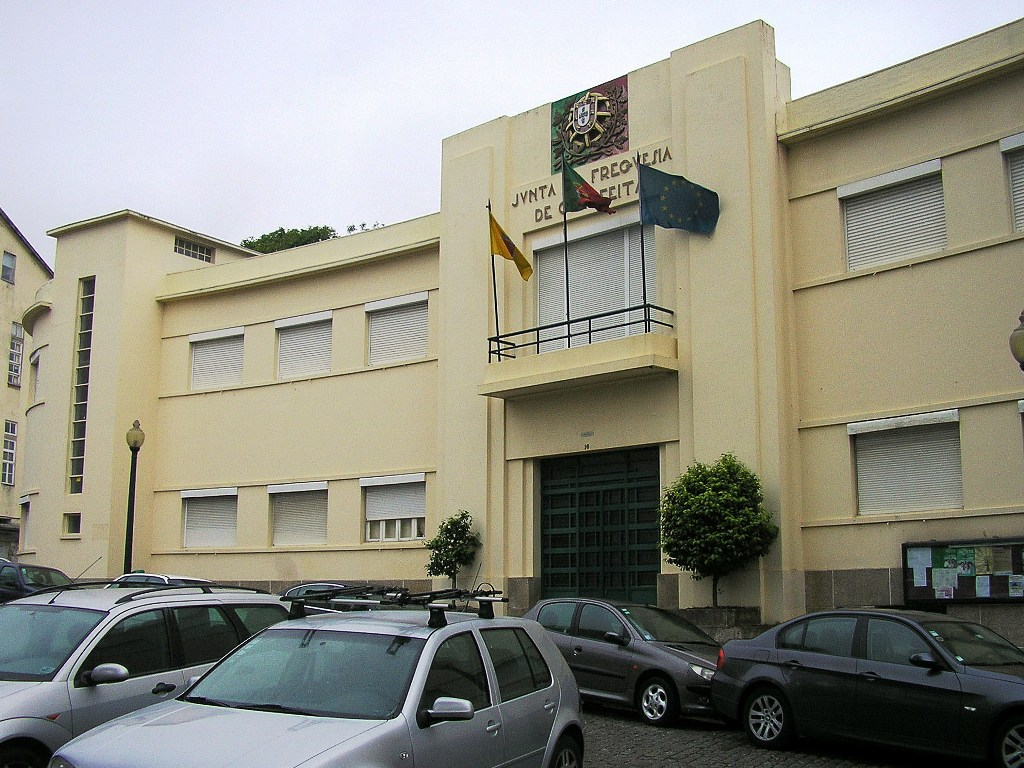
Cedofeita parish council in Porto city, Portugal

Cedofeita, Santo Ildefonso, Sé, Miragaia, São Nicolau e Vitória is a civil parish in the municipality of Porto, Portugal. It was formed in 2013 by the merger of the former parishes Cedofeita, Santo Ildefonso, Sé, Miragaia, São Nicolau and Vitória. The population in 2011 was 40,440, in an area of 5.43 km^{2}. It covers the historic part of the city of Porto.
