= 2025 Porto local election =

Portuguese municipal election

2025 Porto local elections
- 12 October 2025

All 13 Councillors in the Porto City Council 7 seats needed for a majority
- Opinion polls
- Turnout: 57.0% ▲8.2 pp
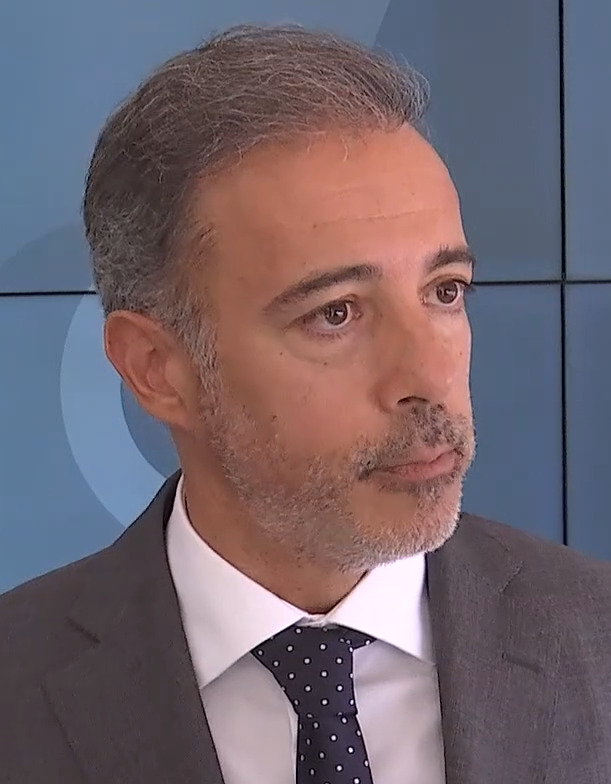

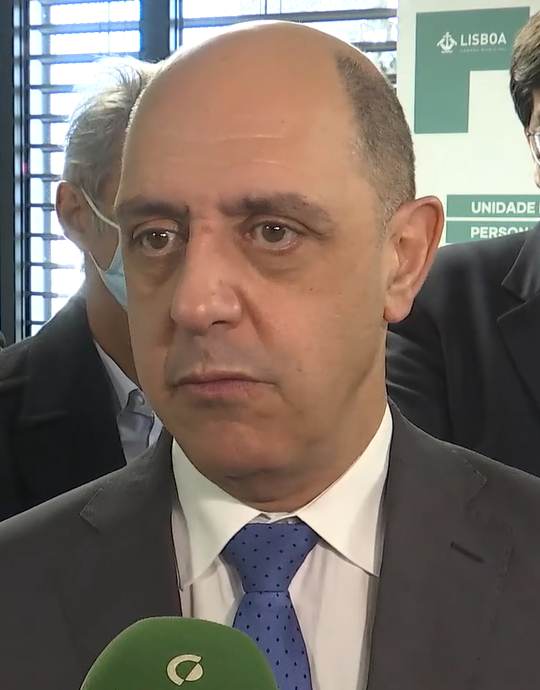

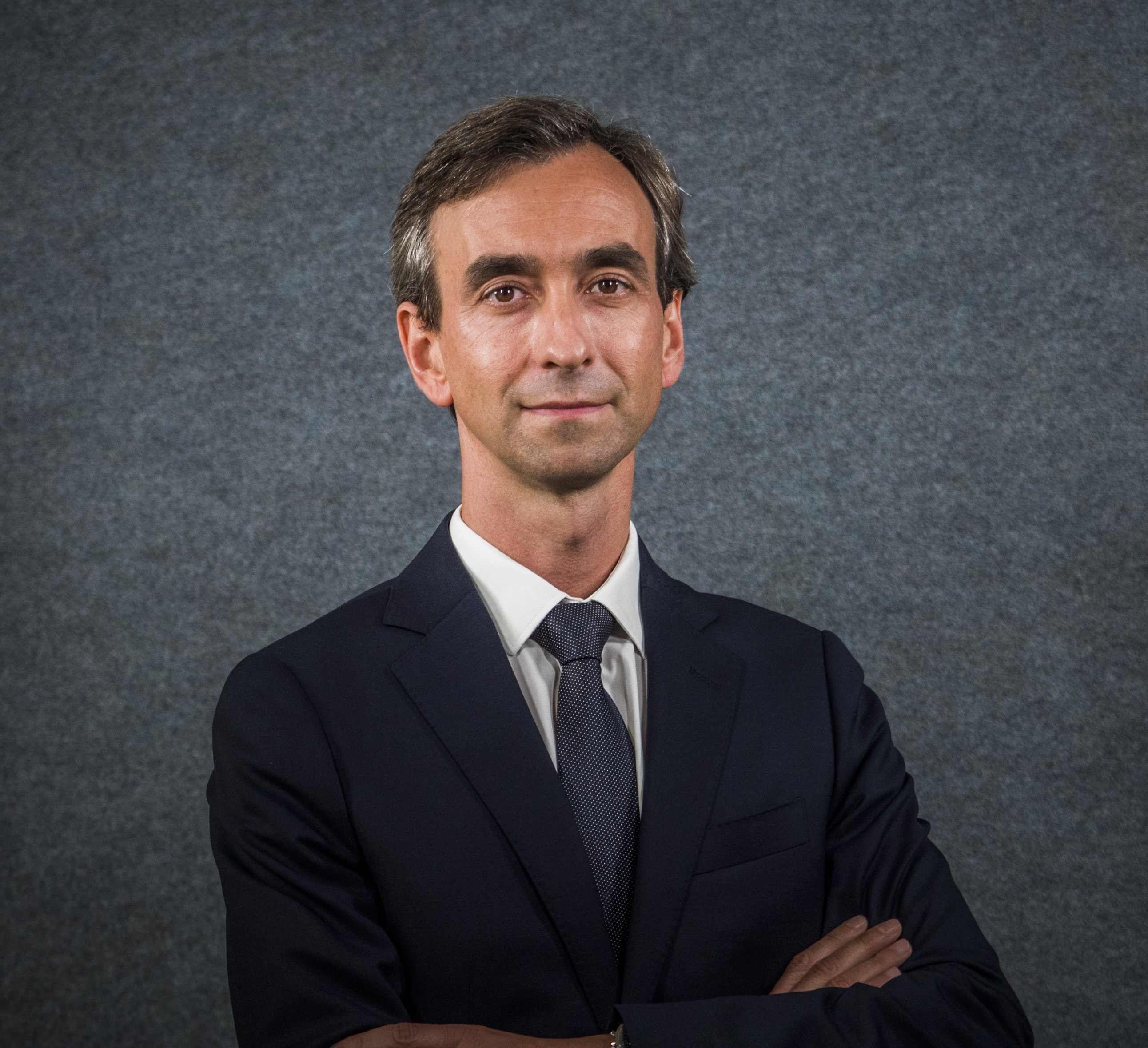
	First party	Second party
Leader	Pedro Duarte	Manuel Pizarro
Party	PSD	PS
Alliance	Porto is us (Note: Coalition with PSD, IL and CDS–PP.)
Last election	2 seats, 17.2%	3 seats, 18.0%
Seats won	6	6
Seat change	▲4	▲3
Popular vote	42,984	40,863
Percentage	37.4%	35.5%
Swing	▲20.2 pp	▲17.4 pp
	Third party	Fourth party
Leader	Miguel Corte-Real	Filipe Araújo
Party	CH	Independent
Alliance		Do it as Porto
Last election	0 seats, 3.0%	6 seats, 40.7%
Seats won	1	0
Seat change	▲1	▼6
Popular vote	9,473	5,845
Percentage	8.2%	5.1%
Swing	▲5.2 pp	▼35.6 pp
Mayor before election
Rui Moreira
Independent
Elected mayor
Pedro Duarte
PSD

The 2025 Porto local election was held on 12 October 2025 to elect the members for Porto City Council, Porto Municipal Assembly and the city's 7 parish assemblies.

This election was expected to be extremely competitive after the 3 mandates of the liberal-backed Independent Rui Moreira, which was barred from running for a 4th term, with both the Socialists and Social Democrats hoping to win the second major city in Portugal, and Moreira's independent movement presenting then deputy mayor Filipe Araújo as a candidate, despite not having the endorsement of Rui Moreira himself.

The Socialist Party chose former Health minister Manuel Pizarro as their candidate, while the Social Democratic Party formed a coalition with the CDS – People's Party and the Liberal Initiative with former minister of Parliament Affairs Pedro Duarte as their candidate.

The final result was very close, with the PSD/CDS/IL candidate, Pedro Duarte, prevailing over the PS by just 2,000 votes. Manuel Pizarro (PS) failed in his 3rd attempt to become mayor of Porto, leading the Socialists to another defeat; the last time the PS won a local election in Porto was 1997. Chega gathered 8.5% of the votes and elected one councillor, while CDU failed to win representation for Porto city council for the first time ever. Deputy mayor Filipe Araújo had a very poor result, just 5% and failed to be elected to council, while the Left Bloc also lost its sole councillor, and polled at just 1.8%. Turnout increased considerably in this election, with 57% of voters casting a ballot, the highest share since 1993.

== Background ==
In the 2021 election, Rui Moreira, mayor since 2013, won a third term as Mayor of Porto, winning 40.7% of the votes and 6 seats, losing his majority in the city council. The Socialist candidate, Tiago Barbosa Ribeiro, won 18.0% of the vote and 3 seats, while the Social Democratic candidate, Vladimiro Feliz, won 17.2% of the votes and 2 seats.

The Unitary Democratic Coalition, led by Ilda Figueiredo, won 7.5% of the votes and 1 seat, while the Left Bloc, which presented Sérgio Aires as a candidate for mayor, gained a seat in the City Council, for the first time in its history, achieving 6.3% of the votes.

=== Candidates selection ===
After 12 years of Independent Rui Moreira as Mayor, the two major parties, the Socialist Party and the Social Democratic Party, sought to retake Porto.

On the right, Filipe Araújo, the leader of Rui Moreira's independent movement and Deputy Mayor, sought to run as an independent, despite pressures from the PSD who wanted to prevent a split among the right. The PSD waited for Minister of Parliamentary Affairs Pedro Duarte to be the party's candidate for Mayor, despite having other options such as MP Miguel Guimarães, while initiating talks with CDS–PP and the Liberal Initiative for a coalition.

In April 2025, Pedro Duarte confirmed his intention to run for Mayor with a PSD/CDS/IL coalition. Meanwhile, Filipe Araújo decided to still run, despite not having the endorsement of Rui Moreira.

On the left, the PS had several potential candidates, such as former minister and former Mayor of Baião José Luís Carneiro, executive director of the National Healthcare Service Fernando Araújo and former minister of Health and candidate for mayor in 2013 and 2017 Manuel Pizarro. Pizarro was eventually chosen as the candidate.

== Electoral system ==
Each party or coalition must present a list of candidates. The winner of the most voted list for the municipal council is automatically elected mayor, similar to first-past-the-post (FPTP). The lists are closed and the seats in each municipality are apportioned according to the D'Hondt method. Unlike in national legislative elections, independent lists are allowed to run.

== Parties and candidates ==
=== Declared ===
Party/Coalition		Political position	Candidate	2021 result		Ref.
Party/Coalition		Political position	Candidate	Votes (%)	Seats	Ref.
FA	Filipe Araújo: Do it as Porto (Note: Supported by People-Animals-Nature (PAN).); Filipe Araújo: Fazer à Porto	Centre-right to right-wing	Filipe Araújo	40.7%	6 / 13	
PS	Socialist Party (Note: Supported by React, Include, Recycle (RIR).); Partido Socialista	Centre-left	Manuel Pizarro	18.0%	3 / 13	
OPSN	Porto is us O Porto somos nós PSD, IL, CDS–PP	Centre-right to right-wing	Pedro Duarte	17.2%	2 / 13	
CDU	Unitary Democratic Coalition; Coligação Democrática Unitária PCP, PEV	Left-wing to far-left	Diana Ferreira	7.5%	1 / 13	
BE	Left Bloc; Bloco de Esquerda	Left-wing to far-left	Sérgio Aires	6.3%	1 / 13	
CH	Enough! Chega!	Far-right	Miguel Corte-Real	3.0%	0 / 13	
L	FREE; LIVRE	Left-wing	Hélder Sousa	0.5%	0 / 13	
VP	Volt Portugal; Volt Portugal	Centre to centre-left	Guilherme Jorge	0.4%	0 / 13	
NC	Porto First – Nuno Cardoso; Porto Primeiro – Nuno Cardoso NC, PPM	Centre to centre-right	Nuno Cardoso	0.2%	0 / 13	
ADN	National Democratic Alternative; Alternativa Democrática Nacional	Far-right	Frederico Duarte Carvalho	—N/a	—N/a	
PLS	Liberal Social Party; Partido Liberal Social	Centre	Luís Tinoco Azevedo	—N/a	—N/a	
PTP	Portuguese Labour Party; Partido Trabalhista Português	Left-wing	Maria Amélia Costa	—N/a	—N/a	

=== Withdrew ===
Party/Coalition		Political position	Candidate	2021 result		Ref.
Party/Coalition		Political position	Candidate	Votes (%)	Seats	Ref.
RIR	React, Include, Recycle; Reagir, Incluir, Reciclar	Centre	Vitorino Silva	—N/a	—N/a	
ND	New Right; Nova Direita	Right-wing	Aníbal Pinto	—N/a	—N/a	
AA	Porto with Porto; Porto com Porto	Centre	António Araújo	—N/a	—N/a	

== Campaign period ==
=== Party slogans ===
Party or alliance	Original slogan	English translation	Refs
FA	« Fazer à Porto »	"Do it as Porto"	
PS	« À moda do Porto »	"Porto style"	
OPSN	« O Porto somos nós »	"Porto is us"	
CDU	« Porto para todos »	"Porto for all"	
BE	« Estamos aqui »	"We are here"	
CH	« O Miguel Chega para resolver »	"Miguel arrives to solve"	

=== Candidates' debates ===
2025 Porto local election debates
Date	Organisers	Moderator(s)	P Present (Note: Denotes a main invitee attending the event.) NI Not invited I Invited A Absent invitee						
Date	Organisers	Moderator(s)	FA Araújo	PS Pizarro	OPSN Duarte	CDU Ferreira	BE Aires	CH Côrte-Real	Refs
21 Sep 2025	SIC Notícias	Nelma Serpa Pinto	NI	P	P	P	P	P	
26 Sep 2025	Rádio Observador	Carla Jorge de Carvalho; Miguel Viterbo Dias	P	P	P	P	P	P	
27 Sep 2025	CNN Portugal	João Póvoa Marinheiro	P	P	P	P	P	P	
30 Sep 2025	RTP1	Carlos Daniel	P	P	P	P	P	P	

== Opinion polling ==
Exit poll

Polling firm/Link	Fieldwork date	Sample size	FA	OPSN			PS	CDU	BE	CH	L	NC PPM	O	Lead
Polling firm/Link	Fieldwork date	Sample size	FA	IL	CDS	PSD	PS	CDU	BE	CH	L	NC PPM	O	Lead
2025 local election	12 Oct 2025	—N/a	5.1; 0	37.4; 6			35.5; 6	3.9; 0	1.8; 0	8.2; 1	3.4; 0	1.9; 0	2.8; 0	1.9
CESOP–UCP	12 Oct 2025	6,124	4–6; 0/1	36–40; 5/7			33–37; 5/7	4–6; 0/1	1–3; 0	6–9; 1	3–5; 0	1–3; 0	2–7; 0	3
ICS/ISCTE/Pitagórica	12 Oct 2025	7,532	3.8–6.8; 0/1	34.2–39.4; 5/7			32.0–37.2; 5/7	2.7–5.5; 0/1	1.1–3.1; 0/1	6.8–10.2; 0/2	1.1–3.1; 0/1	1.4–3.4; 0/1		2.2
Intercampus	12 Oct 2025	5,890	3.5–7.5; 0/1	37.0–41.0; 6/8			30.8–34.8; 4/6	2.5–6.5; 0/1	0.1–4.1; 0/1	6.2–10.2; 0/2	1.3–5.3; 0/1		2.7–6.7	6.2
Pitagórica	29 Sep–4 Oct 2025	625	7.0; 1	33.1; 6			32.9; 5	3.3; 0	2.9; 0	10.4; 1	3.9; 0	3.3; 0	3.2; 0	0.2
CESOP–UCP	27–28 Sep 2025	1,163	6; 0/1	32; 4/6			29; 4/6	5; 0/1	3; 0	10; 1/2	6; 0/1	4; 0	5; 0	3
ICS/ISCTE	5–16 Sep 2025	805	3; 0	34; 6			37; 6	4; 0	3; 0	10; 1	3; 0	2; 0	4; 0	3
ICS/ISCTE	17 Jun–2 Jul 2025	805	5; 0	33; 5			36; 6	4; 0	3; 0	12; 2	1; 0	2; 0	4; 0	3
2025 Legislative election	18 May 2025	—N/a	—N/a	8.1 (1)	35.1 (Note: PSD and CDS ran in a coalition, the Democratic Alliance (AD).) (5)		23.7 (4)	3.6 (0)	2.9 (0)	14.1 (2)	7.2 (1)	—N/a	5.2 (0)	11.4
2024 EP election	9 Jun 2024	—N/a	—N/a	12.7 (2)	31.2 (4)		27.6 (4)	4.4 (0)	6.6 (1)	6.6 (1)	6.5 (1)	—N/a	4.4 (0)	3.6
2024 Legislative election	10 Mar 2024	—N/a	—N/a	6.8 (1)	34.3 (6)		28.3 (4)	3.4 (0)	5.7 (1)	10.0 (1)	5.6 (0)	—N/a	5.9 (0)	6.0
2022 Legislative election	30 Jan 2022	—N/a	—N/a	7.8 (1)	2.0 (0)	34.7 (5)	35.1 (6)	4.7 (0)	6.0 (1)	3.3 (0)	2.2 (0)	—N/a	4.2 (0)	0.4
2021 local election	26 Sep 2021	—N/a	40.7; 6			17.2; 2	18.0; 3	7.5; 1	6.3; 1	3.0; 0	0.5; 0	0.2; 0	6.6; 0	22.7

== Results ==
=== Municipal Council ===
Summary of the 12 October 2025 Porto City Council elections results
Graph of the party split among 13 seats.
Parties	Votes	%	±pp swing	Councillors	
Parties	Votes	%	±pp swing	Total	±
Social Democratic / People's / Liberal Initiative	42,984	37.36	▲20.2	6	▲4
Socialist	40,863	35.52	▲17.4	6	▲3
Chega	9,473	8.23	▲5.2	1	▲1
Filipe Araújo: Do it as Porto	5,845	5.08	▼35.6	0	▼6
Unitary Democratic Coalition	4,515	3.92	▼3.6	0	▼1
LIVRE	3,825	3.32	▲2.8	0	0
We, the Citizens! / People's Monarchist	2,192	1.91	—N/a	0	—N/a
Left Bloc	2,075	1.80	▼4.4	0	▼1
National Democratic Alternative	363	0.32	—N/a	0	—N/a
Liberal Social	291	0.25	—N/a	0	—N/a
Volt Portugal	222	0.19	—N/a	0	—N/a
Labour	62	0.05	—N/a	0	—N/a
Total valid	112,710	97.96	▲1.4	13	0
Blank ballots	1,439	1.25	▼1.0		
Invalid ballots	904	0.79	▼0.4		
Total	115,053	100.00			
Registered voters/turnout	201,968	56.97	▲8.2		

=== Municipal Assembly ===
Summary of the 12 October 2025 Porto Municipal Assembly elections results
Graph of the party split among 39 seats.
Parties	Votes	%	±pp swing	Seats	
Parties	Votes	%	±pp swing	Total	±
Social Democratic / People's / Liberal Initiative	41,892	36.41	▲17.8	15	▲5
Socialist	35,211	30.60	▲11.4	13	▲3
Chega	10,873	9.45	▲6.1	4	▲3
LIVRE	6,361	5.53	▲4.9	2	▲2
Filipe Araújo: Do it as Porto	6,139	5.34	▼29.2	2	▼13
Unitary Democratic Coalition	5,928	5.15	▼3.2	2	▼1
Left Bloc	2,925	2.54	▼5.0	1	▼2
We, the Citizens! / People's Monarchist	2,149	1.87	—N/a	0	—N/a
National Democratic Alternative	388	0.34	—N/a	0	—N/a
Liberal Social	352	0.31	—N/a	0	—N/a
Volt Portugal	227	0.20	—N/a	0	—N/a
Total valid	112,445	97.73	▲1.2	39	0
Blank ballots	1,613	1.40	▼0.9		
Invalid ballots	1,002	0.87	▼0.3		
Total	115,060	100.00			
Registered voters/turnout	201,968	56.97	▲8.2		

=== Parish Assemblies ===
Results of the 12 October 2025 Porto Parish Assembly elections
Parish	%	S	%	S	%	S	%	S	%	S	%	S	%	S	Total S
Parish	OPSN		PS		CH		FA		L		CDU		BE		Total S
Aldoar, Foz do Douro e Nevogilde	51.0	11	22.0	5	9.0	2	6.5	1	3.5	-	2.9	-	1.5	-	19
Bonfim	33.8	8	27.5	6	8.7	2	6.5	1	7.1	1	7.7	1	3.8	-	19
Campanhã	23.5	5	41.0	10	14.0	3	3.6	-	3.5	-	5.8	1	1.9	-	19
Cedofeita, Santo Ildefonso, Sé, Miragaia, São Nicolau e Vitória	30.8	7	31.9	7	6.5	1	5.2	1	8.3	1	7.0	1	4.3	1	19
Lordelo do Ouro e Massarelos	40.8	9	28.9	6	8.9	1	4.6	1	5.1	1	5.0	1	1.8	-	19
Paranhos	39.8	9	29.6	6	8.4	1	4.3	1	5.7	1	5.2	1	3.1	-	19
Ramalde	40.8	9	30.0	6	9.4	2	5.1	1	4.5	1	3.9	-	1.8	-	19
Total	37.6	58	30.1	46	9.2	12	5.4	6	5.3	5	5.2	5	2.6	1	133

== Aftermath ==
Despite winning the same number of councillors as the PS, Pedro Duarte "gained" an absolute majority after managing to get one of the councillors elected by the PS, Jorge Sobrado, to be part of his local government. Pedro Duarte was sworn in as mayor of Porto, under a majority capacity, on 5 November 2025.
