= Porto Municipal Chamber =

Legislative body of Porto, Portugal

Coordinates: 41.14997°N 8.61070°W

Porto Municipal Chamber Câmara Municipal do Porto
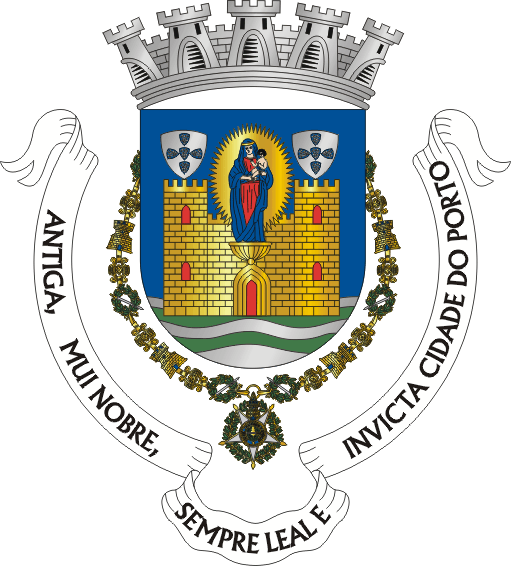
- Coat of arms of the city of Porto

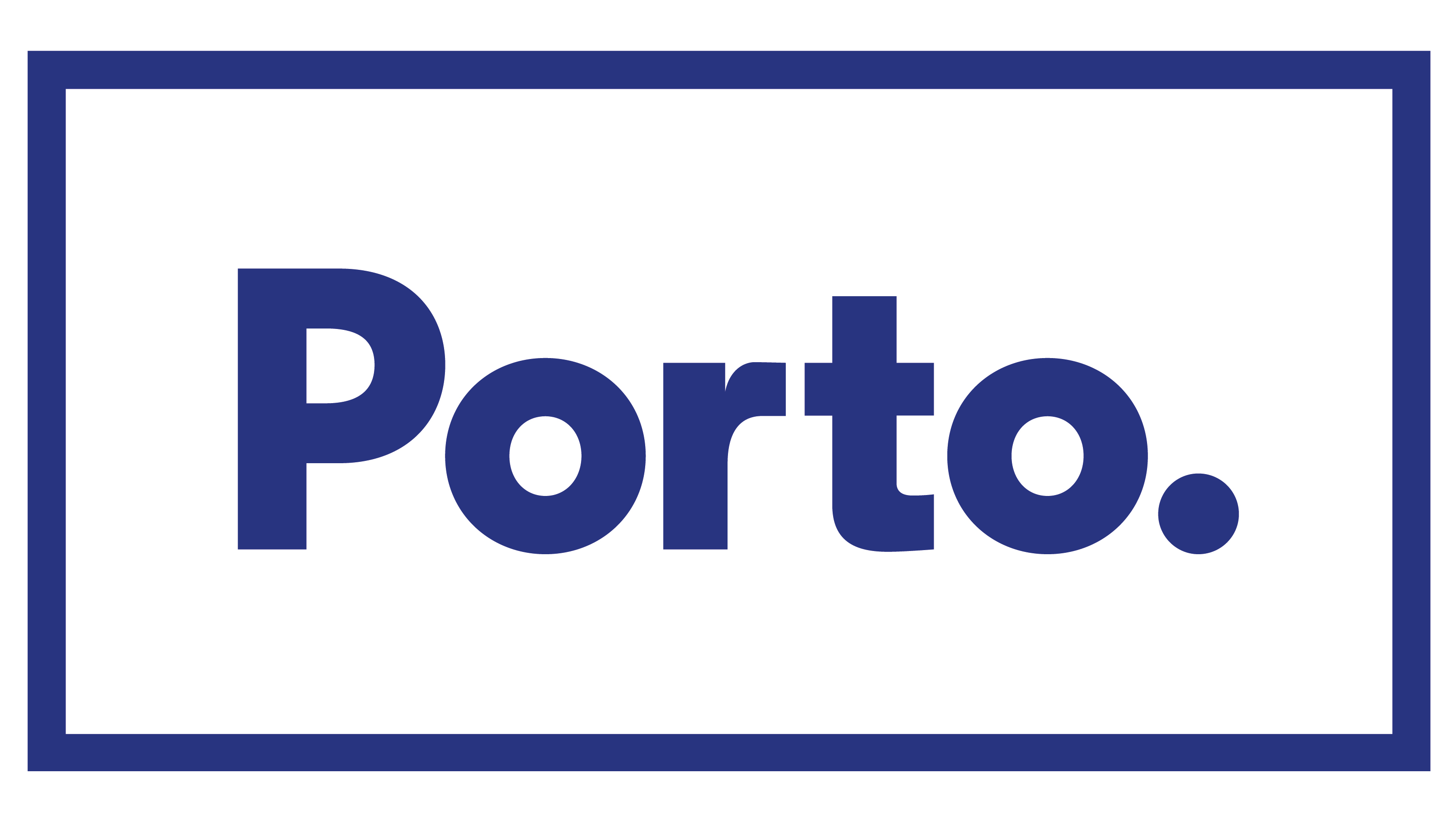
- Logo of the Câmara Municipal of Porto

Type
- Type: Câmara municipal
- Term limits: 3

History
- Founded: 1614; 412 years ago(?)

Leadership
- President: Pedro Duarte, PSD since 29 October 2025
- Vice President: Catarina Araújo, CDS–PP since 29 October 2025

Structure
- Seats: 13 (outdated graph)
- Political groups: Municipal Executive (7) PSD (3) IL (2) CDS-PP (1) Ind. (ex-PS) (1) Opposition (6) PS (5) CH (1)
- Length of term: Four years

Elections
- Last election: 12 October 2025
- Next election: Sometime between 22 September and 14 October 2029

Meeting place
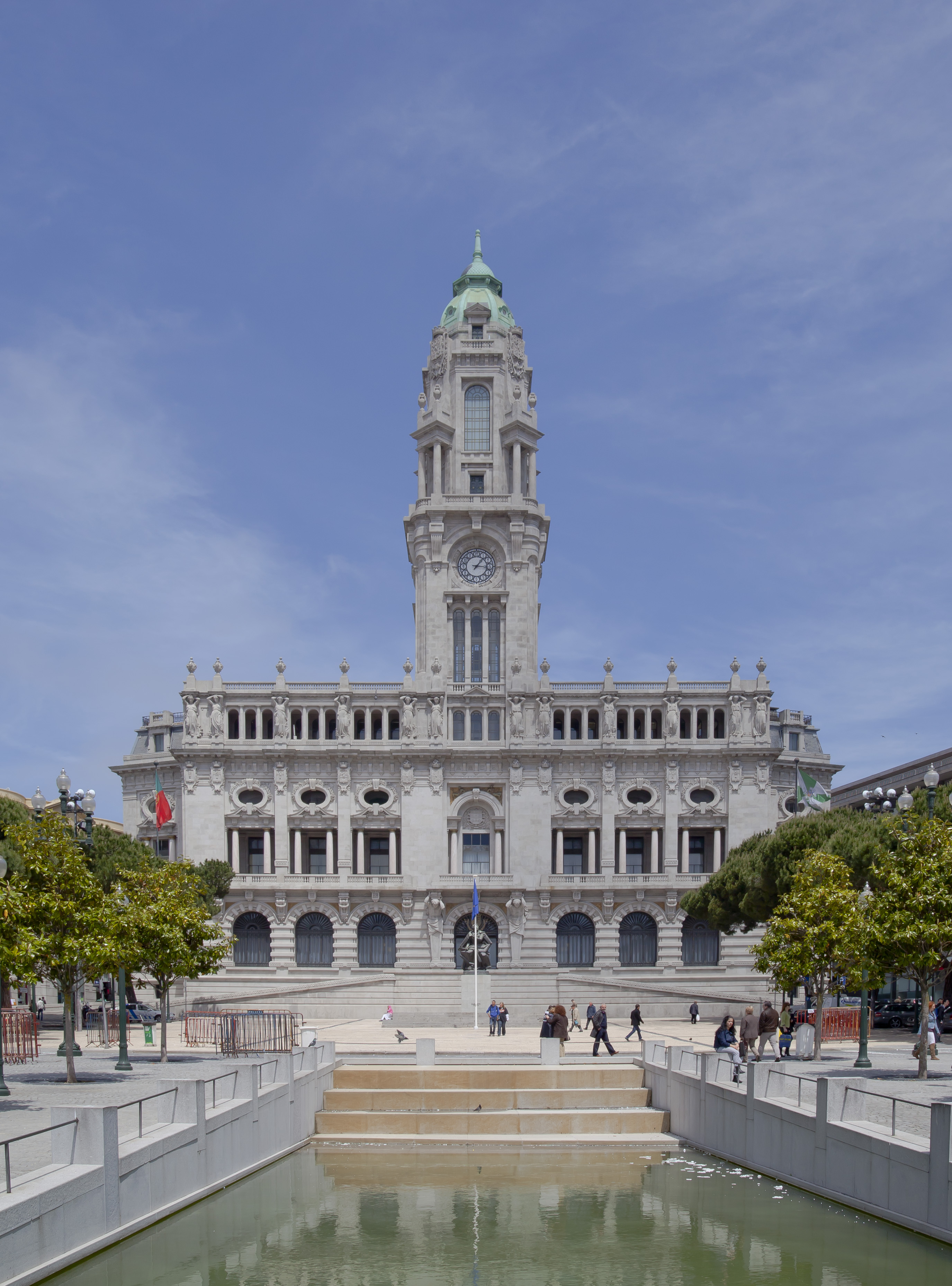
- Paços do Concelho do Porto

Website
- www.cm-porto.pt

The Porto Municipal Chamber (Portuguese: Câmara Municipal do Porto) is the administrative authority in the municipality of Porto. It has 7 freguesias in its area of jurisdiction and is based in the city of Porto, on the Porto District. These freguesias are: Aldoar, Foz do Douro e Nevogilde, Bonfim, Campanhã, Cedofeita, Santo Ildefonso, Sé, Miragaia, São Nicolau e Vitória, Lordelo do Ouro e Massarelos, Paranhos and Ramalde.

The Porto City Council is the second largest in the country and is made up of 13 councillors, representing different political forces. The first candidate on the list with the most votes in a municipal election or, in the event of a vacancy, the next candidate on the list, takes office as President of the Municipal Chamber.

== List of the Presidents of the Municipal Chamber of Porto ==
- Tomás da Silva Ferraz – (1822–1823)
- Manuel Nunes Choça do Couto – (1823)
- João Rodrigues de Oliveira Catalão – (1823–1826)
- José Bento da Rocha e Melo – (1826–1828)
- António da Cunha e Vasconcelos – (1828)
- José Bento da Rocha e Melo – (1828–1829)
- João Manuel Alexandrino de Vasconcelos – (1829–1830)
- Francisco Ribeiro de Figueiredo – (1830–1832)
- Arnaldo van Zeller – (1832–1833)
- José Freire Pimentel de Mesquita e Vasconcelos – (1833)
- António Alexandre Rodrigues de Oliveira – (1833–1834)
- José da Silva Passos – (1834)
- António Alexandre Rodrigues de Oliveira – (1834)
- Vicente Ferreira de Novais – (1835)
- João Manuel Teixeira de Carvalho – (1835)
- Francisco da Rocha Soares – (1835–1836)
- João José Coelho – (1836)
- Manuel Pereira Guimarães – (1836)
- Tadeu António de Faria – (1836–1837)
- Luciano Simões de Carvalho – (1837–1838)
- Miguel Joaquim Gomes Cardoso Júnior – (1839)
- Francisco da Rocha Soares – (1840)
- José Maria Ribeiro Pereira – (1840–1841)
- Jerónimo Carneiro Geraldes – (1841–1842)
- Visconde de Alpendurada – (1842–1846)
- José da Silva Passos – (1846)
- Manuel Joaquim Machado – (1846–1847)
- Luís Brandão de Melo Cogominho Pereira de Lacerda – (1847)
- Viscount of Alpendurada – (1847–1849)
- Domingos Ribeiro de Faria – (1850–1851)
- Viscount of Trindade – (1852–1855)
- Viscount of Alpendurada – (1856–1858)
- Count of Lagoaça – (1858–1865)
- Francisco Pinto Bessa – (1866–1878)
- António Pinto de Magalhães Aguiar – (1878–1881)
- José Augusto Correia de Barros – (1881–1886)
- José Frutuoso Aires de Gouveia Osório – (1887)
- António de Oliveira Monteiro – (1887–1992)
- António Ribeiro da Costa e Almeida – (1893–1896)
- Venceslau de Sousa Pereira de Lima – (1896–1898)
- João Baptista de Lima Júnior – (1898–1900)
- Venceslau de Sousa Pereira de Lima – (1900–1901)
- Manuel de Sousa Avides – (1902–1905)
- João Baptista de Lima Júnior – (1905–1906)
- Jacinto da Silva Pereira Magalhães – (1907)
- José Nunes da Ponte – (1907–1908)
- Cândido Augusto Correia de Pinho – (1908–1911)
- José Nunes da Ponte – (1910–1911)
- Francisco Xavier Esteves – (1911–1913)
- Adriano Augusto Pimenta – (1913)
- Manuel de Morais e Costa – (1913–1914)
- Henrique Pereira de Oliveira – (1914–1915)
- Francisco Xavier Esteves – (1915)
- Henrique Pereira de Oliveira – (1915–1917)
- Augusto Pereira Nobre – (1918)
- Artur Jorge Guimarães – (1918)
- Augusto Cupertino de Miranda – (1918)
- José Nunes da Ponte – (1918)
- José Alves Bonifácio – (1918–1919)
- Armando Manuel Marques Guedes – (1919)
- José Gonçalves Barbosa de Castro Júnior – (1919–1920)
- Eduardo Ferreira dos Santos Silva – (1920–1921)
- António Joaquim de Sousa Júnior – (1921–1924)
- José Pereira da Silva – (1925)
- António Joaquim de Sousa Júnior – (1925)
- Alberto de Aguiar – (1926)
- Raul de Andrade Peres – (1926–1930)
- Augusto de Sousa Rosa – (1930–1933)
- José Alfredo Mendes de Magalhães – (1933–1936)
- António Mendes Correia – (1936–1942)
- João de Espregueira Mendes – (1942)
- Albano do Carmo Rodrigues Sarmento – (1942–1944)
- Jorge de Viterbo Ferreira – (1944–1945)
- Luís José de Pina Guimarães – (1945–1949)
- Francisco Nicolau de Sousa Dias Goulão – (1949)
- Lucínio Gonçalves Presa – (1949–1953)
- António de Oliveira Cálem – (1953)
- José Albino Machado Vaz – (1953–1962)
- Nuno Maria de Figueiredo Cabral Pinheiro Torres – (1962–1969)
- António Fontes Veiga de Faria – (1969)
- Nuno Henrique Macieira de Vasconcelos Porto – (1969–1974)
- Artur Vieira de Andrade – (1974–1975)
- Boaventura José Martins Ferreira – (1975)
- Rogério Manuel de Castro Tavares – (1975–1976)
- Aureliano Capelo Veloso – (1976–1980)
- Alfredo Coelho de Magalhães – (1979–1982)
- Paulo Vallada – (1982–1985)
- Fernando Cabral – (1985–1989)
- Fernando Manuel Gomes – (1989–1999)
- Nuno Cardoso – (1999–2001)
- Rui Rio – (2001–2013)
- Rui Moreira – (2013–2025)
- Pedro Duarte – (2025-present)
