= 2013 Porto local election =

Portuguese municipal election

2013 Porto local elections
- 29 September 2013

All 13 Councillors in the Porto City Council 7 seats needed for a majority
- Opinion polls
- Turnout: 52.6% ▼4.2 pp
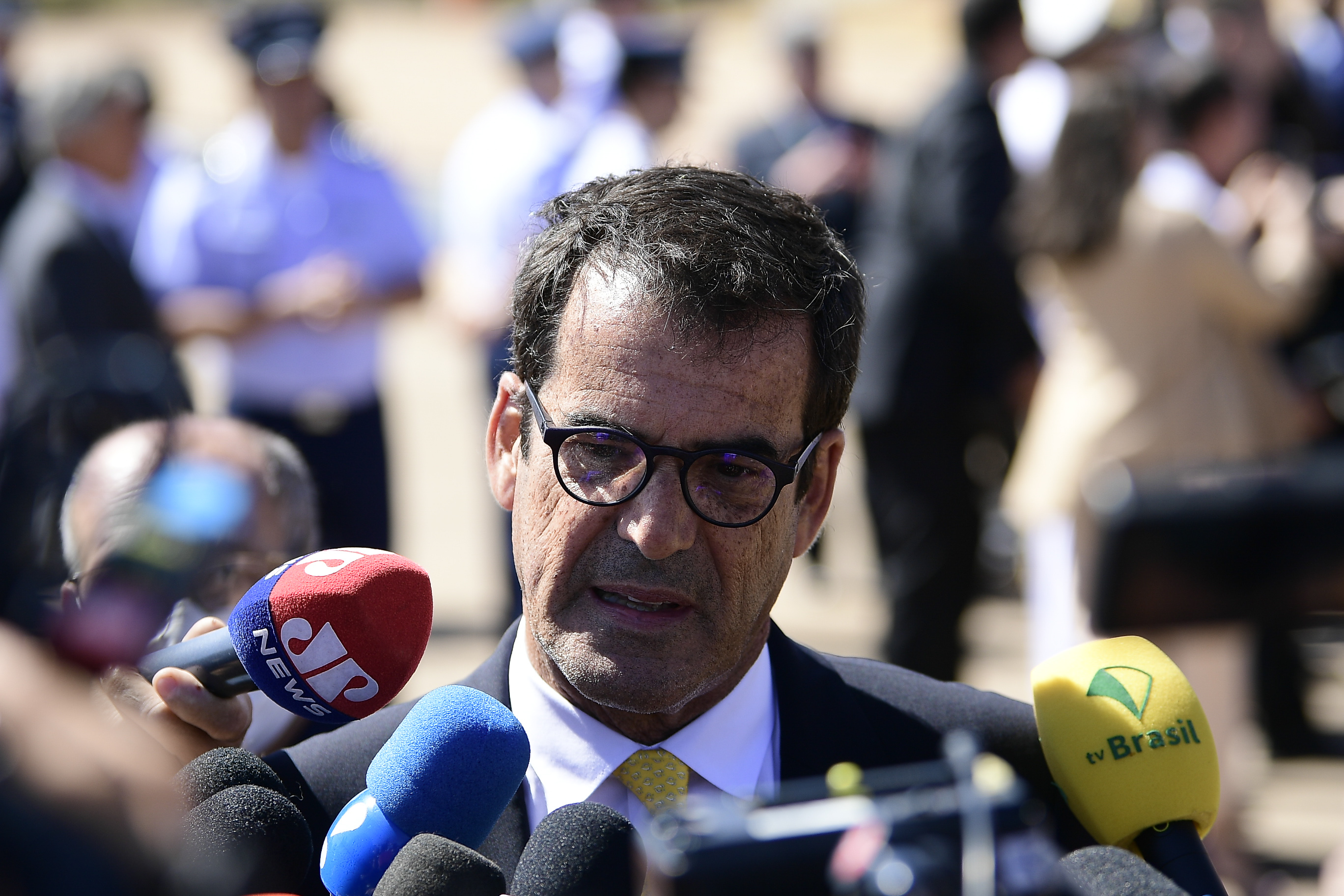

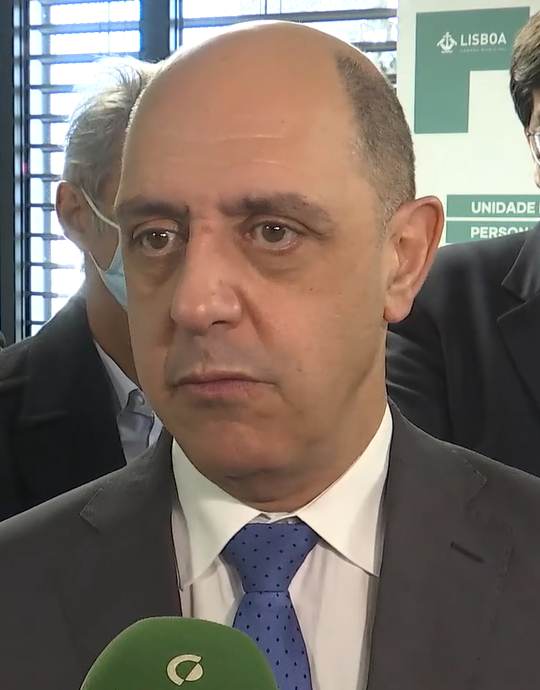

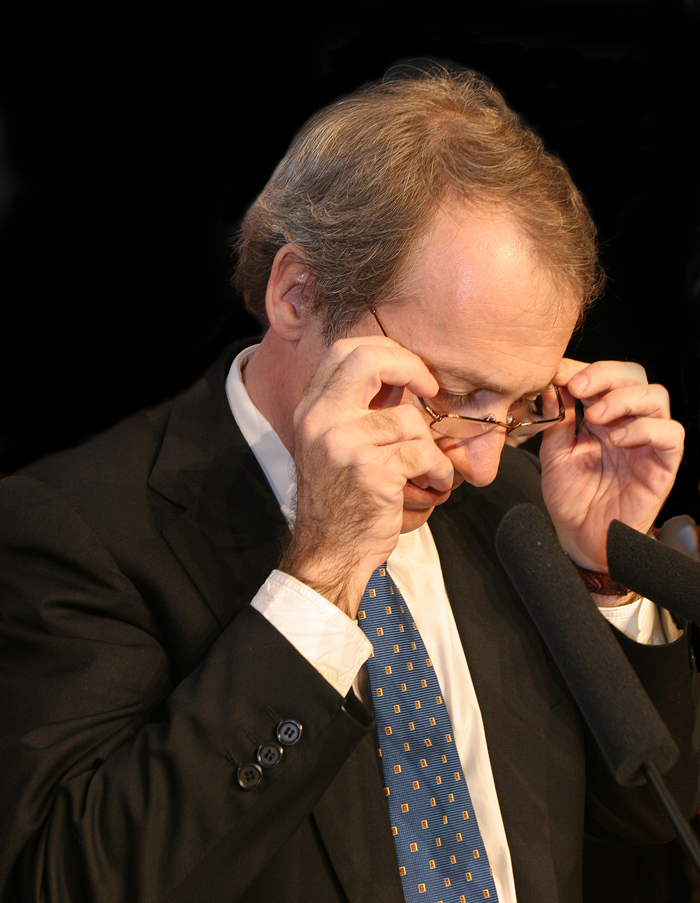

	First party	Second party
Leader	Rui Moreira	Manuel Pizarro
Party	Independent	PS
Alliance	Porto, Our Party
Last election	Did not contest	5 seats, 34.7%
Seats won	6	3
Seat change	New party	▼2
Popular vote	45,411	26,237
Percentage	39.3%	22.7%
Swing	New party	▼12.0 pp
	Third party	Fourth party
Leader	Luís Filipe Menezes	Pedro Carvalho
Party	PSD	PCP
Alliance	Strong Porto (Note: Coalition with PPD/PSD, PPM and MPT.)	CDU
Last election	5 seats (PP) (Note: In the 2009 election, PSD and CDS-PP ran in a coalition called Porto First, achieving 47.5% of the votes and 7 councillors. PSD elected 5 councillors and CDS-PP elected 2 councillors.)	1 seat, 9.8%
Seats won	3	1
Seat change	▼2	Steady
Popular vote	24,366	8,539
Percentage	21.1%	7.4%
Swing		▼2.4 pp
Mayor before election
Rui Rio
PSD
Elected mayor
Rui Moreira
Independent

The 2013 Porto local election was held on 29 September 2013 to elect the members of the Porto City Council.

Rui Moreira, an independent candidate, won the election and became the Mayor of Porto, succeeding Rui Rio. He beat the Socialist candidate, Manuel Pizarro, who got 22.7% of the votes and 3 councillors, and the Mayor of Vila Nova de Gaia, Luís Filipe Menezes, the Social Democratic candidate, who achieved 21.1% of the votes and also got 3 councillors. The Unitary Democratic Coalition, led by Pedro Carvalho, kept its seat in the city council, having a slight drop in the vote share to 7.4%

The Left Bloc failed to win any seats in the city council, just like Nuno Cardoso, the former Mayor of Porto from 1999 to 2002, who ran as an independent.

Rui Moreira failed to achieve an absolute majority, and as such governed with the Socialist Party.

== Background ==
In the 2009 election, Rui Rio, candidate for the PSD/CDS coalition, won a third and final term as mayor of Porto, winning 47.5% of the votes and 7 seats, an absolute majority. The Socialist Party, led by Elisa Ferreira, achieved second place with 5 seats and about 35% of the votes. The Unitary Democratic Coalition got 1 seat and 9.8% of the votes.

== Electoral system ==
Each party or coalition must present a list of candidates. The winner of the most voted list for the municipal council is automatically elected mayor, similar to first-past-the-post (FPTP). The lists are closed and the seats in each municipality are apportioned according to the D'Hondt method. Unlike in national legislative elections, independent lists are allowed to run.

== Parties and candidates ==
Party/Coalition		Political position	Candidate	2009 result	
Party/Coalition		Political position	Candidate	Votes (%)	Seats
PF	Strong Porto; Porto Forte PSD, PPM, MPT	Centre-right	Luís Filipe Menezes	47.5%	5 / 13
PS	Socialist Party; Partido Socialista	Centre-left	Manuel Pizarro	34.7%	5 / 13
CDU	Unitary Democratic Coalition; Coligação Democrática Unitária PCP, PEV	Left-wing to far-left	Pedro Carvalho	7.4%	1 / 13
BE	Left Bloc; Bloco de Esquerda	Left-wing to far-left	José Soeiro	5.0%	0 / 13
PCTP	Portuguese Workers' Communist Party; Partido Comunista dos Trabalhadores Portugueses	Far-left	José Carlos Santos	0.7%	0 / 13
PTP	Portuguese Labour Party; Partido Trabalhista Português	Center-left	José Manuel Pereira	—N/a	—N/a
NC	Nuno Cardoso – Porto of Future; Nuno Cardoso – Porto de Futuro	Center-left	Nuno Cardoso	—N/a	—N/a
RM	Porto, Our Party (Note: Included members of the CDS – People's Party.); Porto, O nosso Partido	Center-right to right-wing	Rui Moreira	—N/a	2 / 13

== Opinion polling ==
Exit poll

Polling firm/Link	Fieldwork date	Sample size	PSD PPM MPT	PS	CDU	BE	RM	NC	O	Lead
2013 local election	29 Sep 2013	—N/a	21.1; 3	22.7; 3	7.4; 1	3.6; 0	39.3; 6	1.1; 0	4.9; 0	16.6
UCP–CESOP	29 Sep 2013	8,777	22– 25; 3/4	21– 24; 3/4	7– 9; 1	3– 5; 0/1	36– 40; 5/6	–	–	14– 15
Eurosondagem	29 Sep 2013	6,983	19.4– 23.2; 3/4	25.0– 28.8; 3/4	7.0– 9.3; 1	4.0– 6.2; 0/1	30.0– 34.2; 4/5	1.0– 1.8; 0	–	5.0– 5.4
Eurosondagem	23–25 Sep 2013	1,010	26.9; 4	24.1; 4	10.5; 1	4.5; 0	26.5; 4	3.9; 0	3.6; 0	0.4
Aximage	21–25 Sep 2013	602	27.5	28.1	8.3	4.1	29.2	—N/a	2.8	1.1
UCP–CESOP	21–23 Sep 2013	1,272	26; 3/4	24; 3/4	9; 1	5; 0/1	29; 4/5	2; 0	5; 0	3
IPOM	21–23 Sep 2013	1,000	37.5	26.6	8.1	5.0	14.4	2.5	5.9	10.9
Eurosondagem	6–7 Aug 2013	603	32.1; 5	23.8; 3/4	8.5; 1	4.5; 0	24.8; 3/4	3.3; 0	3.0; 0	7.3
Eurosondagem	24–25 Jul 2013	810	32.5; 5	22.5; 3	8.4; 1	4.8; 0	25.2; 4	3.6; 0	3.0; 0	7.3
IPOM	29–30 Jun 2013	1,020	39.6	24.9	4.9	4.7	16.2	3.6	6.1	14.7
Eurosondagem	20–22 May 2013	804	33.0; 5	24.8; 3/4	10.2; 1	4.3; 0	25.0; 3/4	—N/a	2.7; 0	8.0
IPOM	13–15 Apr 2013	2,962	41.0	21.8	9.5	6.0	17.2	—N/a	4.4	19.2
IPOM	17–23 Jan 2013	796	21.2	15.8	1.9	1.9	4.2	—N/a	55.0	5.4
IPOM	17–23 Jan 2013	796	31.7	13.5	—N/a	—N/a	12.1	—N/a	42.6	18.2
2009 local election	11 Oct 2009	—N/a	47.5; 7	34.7; 5	9.8; 1	5.0; 0	—N/a	—N/a	3.1; 0	12.8

== Results ==
=== Municipal Council ===
Summary of the 29 September 2013 Municipal Council elections results in Porto
Parties	Votes	%	±pp swing	Councillors	
Parties	Votes	%	±pp swing	Total	±
Porto, Our Party	45,411	39.25	—N/a	6	—N/a
Socialist	26,237	22.68	▼12.0	3	▼2
Social Democratic / People's Monarchist / Earth	24,366	21.06	—N/a	3	▼2
Unitary Democratic Coalition	8,539	7.38	▼2.4	1	0
Left Bloc	4,166	3.60	▼1.4	0	0
Nuno Cardoso – Porto our Future	1,255	1.08	—N/a	0	—N/a
Portuguese Workers' Communist	343	0.30	▼0.4	0	0
Labour	279	0.24	—N/a	0	—N/a
Total valid	110,596	95.59	▼2.1	13	0
Blank ballots	2,922	2.53	▲1.2		
Invalid ballots	2,180	1.88	▲0.9		
Total	115,698	100.00			
Registered voters/turnout	219,949	52.60	▼4.2		
Source: Porto 2013 election results

=== Municipal Assembly ===
Summary of the 29 September 2013 Porto Municipal Assembly elections results
Parties	Votes	%	±pp swing	Seats	
Parties	Votes	%	±pp swing	Total	±
Porto, Our Party	40,134	34.69	—N/a	15	—N/a
Socialist	27,413	23.70	▼10.1	10	▼4
Social Democratic / People's Monarchist / Earth	23,495	20.31	—N/a	8	—N/a
Unitary Democratic Coalition	11,436	9.89	▼1.1	4	0
Left Bloc	5,760	4.98	▼2.5	2	▼1
Nuno Cardoso – Porto our Future	1,272	1.10	—N/a	0	—N/a
Labour	330	0.29	—N/a	0	—N/a
Total valid	109,840	94.95	▼2.5	39	0
Blank ballots	3,426	2.96	▲1.3		
Invalid ballots	2,416	2.09	▲1.2		
Total	115,682	100.00			
Registered voters/turnout	219,949	52.59	▼4.2		
Source: Porto 2013 election results

=== Parish Assemblies ===
Results of the 29 September 2013 Porto Parish Assembly elections
Parish	%	S	%	S	%	S	%	S	%	S	Total S
Parish	RM		PS		PF		CDU		BE		Total S
Aldoar, Foz do Douro e Nevogilde	45.8	10	23.5	5	17.8	3	5.5	1	5.0	-	19
Bonfim	38.1	8	21.9	4	20.2	4	10.7	2	4.9	1	19
Campanhã	17.9	4	39.1	9	20.0	4	12.6	2	4.1	-	19
Cedofeita, Santo Ildefonso, Sé, Miragaia, São Nicolau e Vitória	30.3	7	24.0	6	21.6	5	11.6	2	6.3	1	21
Lordelo do Ouro e Massarelos	38.1	8	21.9	4	20.2	4	10.7	2	4.5	1	19
Paranhos	26.2	6	24.3	5	29.4	7	9.5	2	4.7	1	21
Ramalde	35.7	8	26.0	5	20.1	4	7.9	1	4.8	1	19
Total	31.6	49	26.0	39	22.5	32	9.7	12	4.7	5	137
Source: Election Results
