= 2021 Porto local election =

Portuguese municipal election

2021 Porto local elections
- 26 September 2021

All 13 Councillors in the Porto City Council 7 seats needed for a majority
- Opinion polls
- Turnout: 48.8% ▼4.9 pp
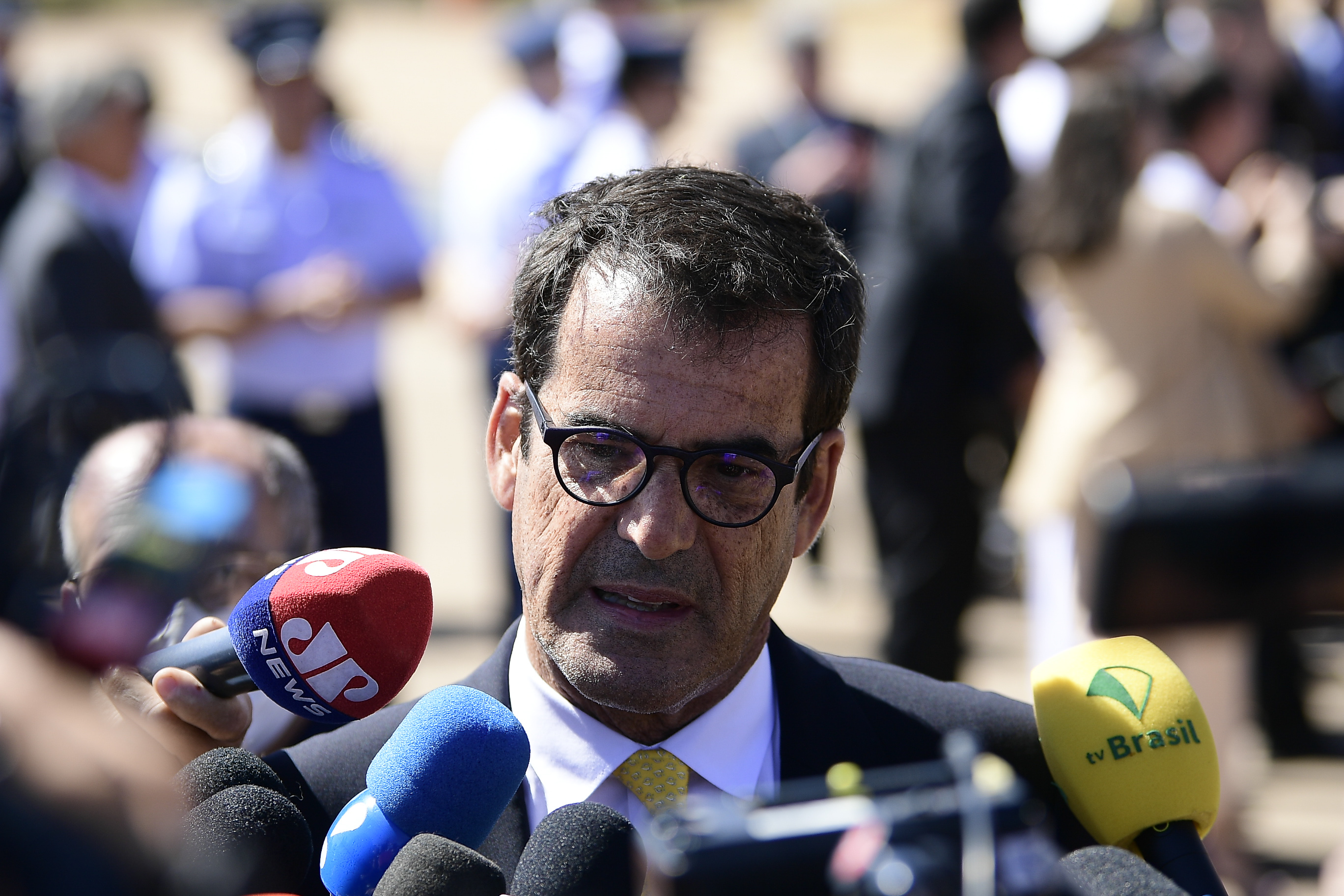

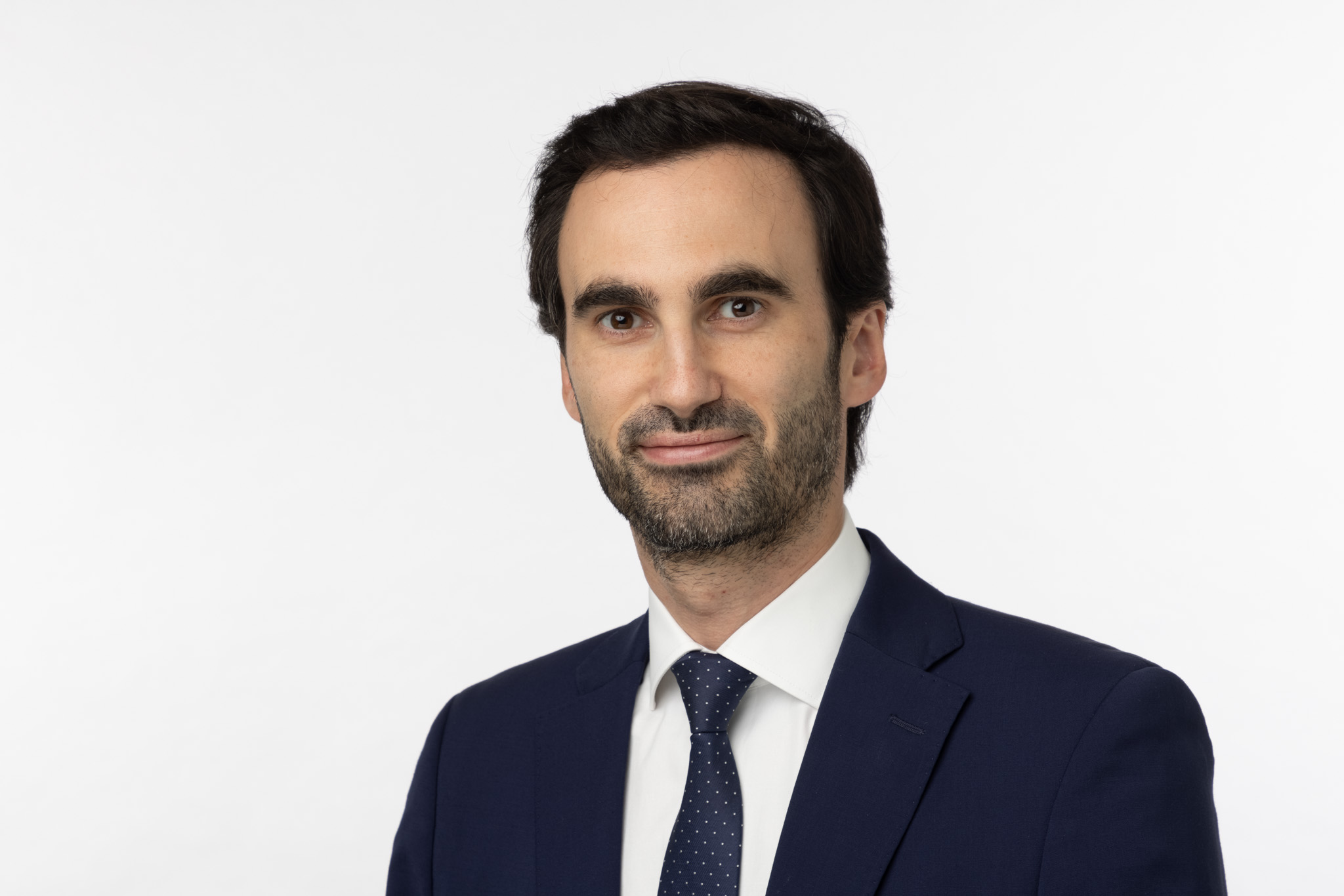

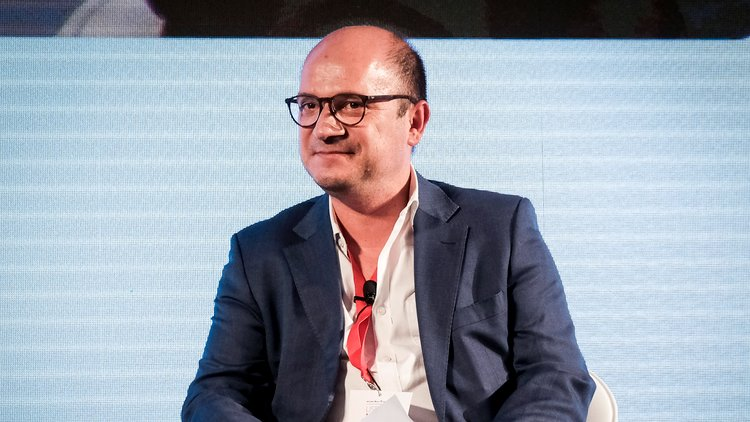

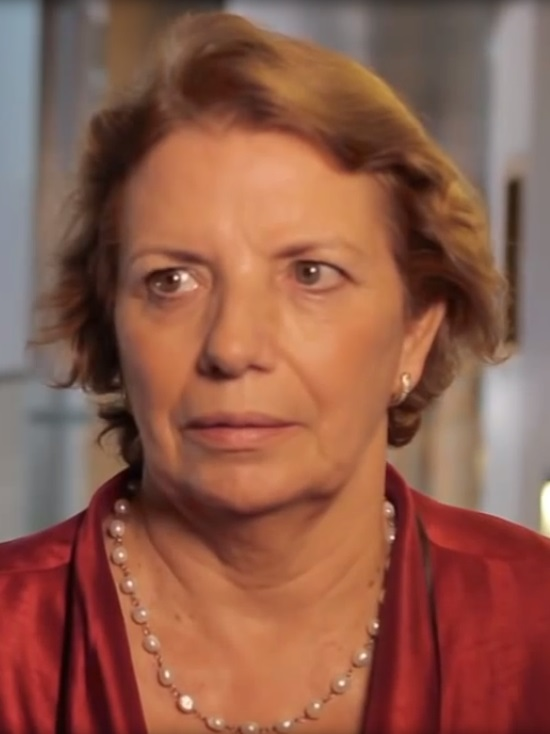

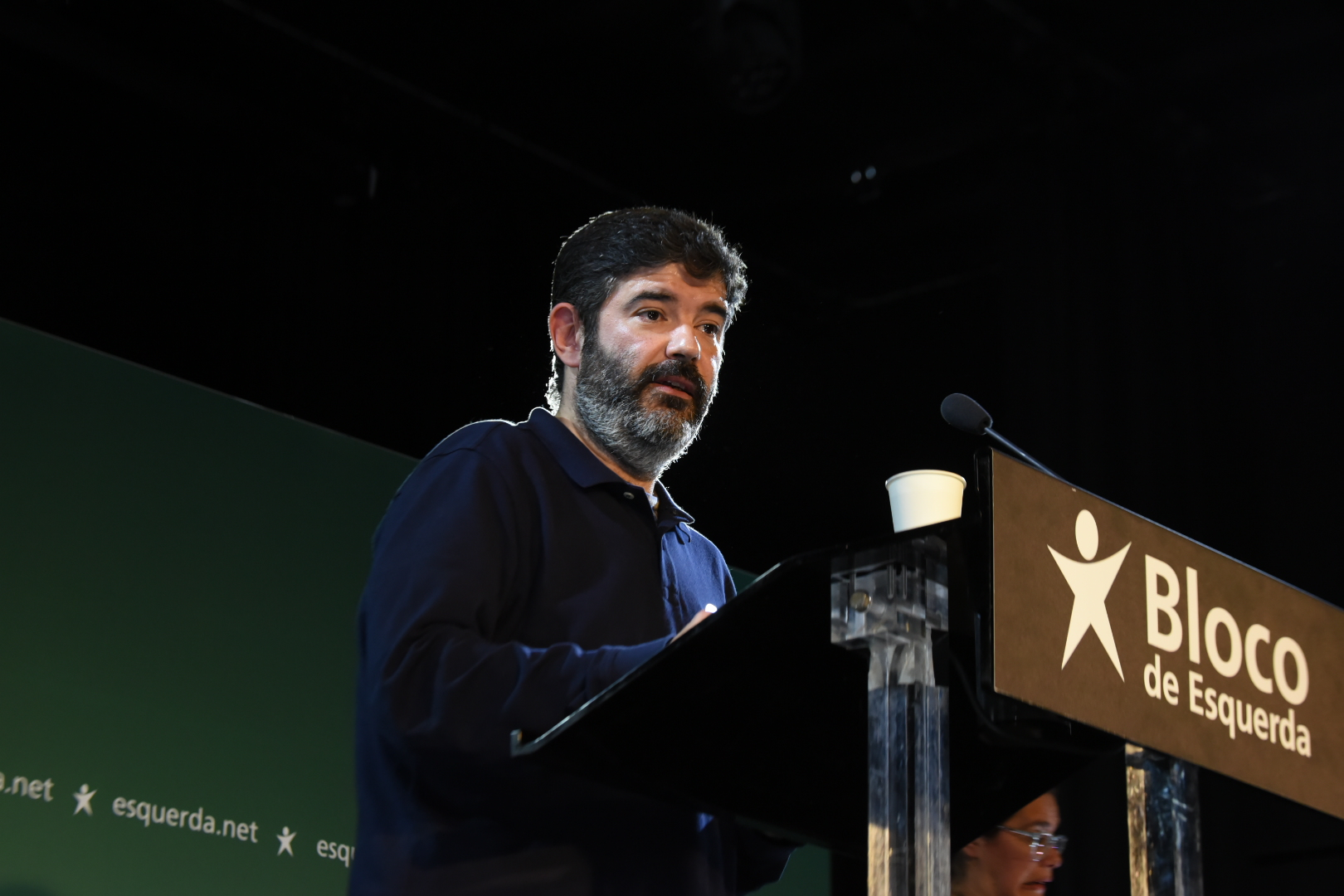
| | First party | Second party | Third party |
|---|---|---|---|
| Leader | Rui Moreira | Tiago Barbosa Ribeiro | Vladimiro Feliz |
| Party | Independent | PS | PSD |
| Alliance | Here There's Porto |
| Last election | 7 seats, 44.5% | 4 seats, 28.6% | 1 seat (PA) (Note: In 2017, the Social Democratic Party (PSD) and the People's Monarchist Party (PPM) ran in a coalition, winning 10.4% of the votes and 1 councillor.) |
| Seats won | 6 | 3 | 2 |
| Seat change | ▼1 | ▼1 | ▲1 |
| Popular vote | 41,167 | 18,201 | 17,426 |
| Percentage | 40.7% | 18.0% | 17.2% |
| Swing | ▼3.7 pp | ▼10.6 pp |
| | Fourth party | Fifth party |
| Leader | Ilda Figueiredo | Sérgio Aires |
| Party | PCP | BE |
| Alliance | CDU |
| Last election | 1 seat, 5.9% | 0 seats, 5.3% |
| Seats won | 1 | 1 |
| Seat change | Steady | ▲1 |
| Popular vote | 7,609 | 6,323 |
| Percentage | 7.5% | 6.3% |
| Swing | ▲1.6 pp | ▲0.9 pp |
Mayor before election
Rui Moreira
Independent
Elected mayor
Rui Moreira
Independent

The 2021 Porto local election was held on 26 September 2021 to elect the members of the Porto City Council.

As expected, Rui Moreira, mayor since 2013, won a third term as Mayor of Porto, despite losing his majority in the city council. He beat the Socialist candidate, Tiago Barbosa Ribeiro, who lost about 10% of the votes and 1 city councillor, and the Social Democratic candidate, Vladimiro Feliz, who despite an increase in his vote share failed to achieve the goal of surpassing the PS.

The Unitary Democratic Coalition presented Ilda Figueiredo again and achieved positive results, registering a slight electoral growth to 7.5 percent. The Left Bloc, which presented Sérgio Aires as a candidate for mayor, gained a seat in the City Council, for the first time in its history.

People-Animals-Nature and Chega failed to elect any councilor.

== Background ==
In the 2017 election, Rui Moreira's independent movement won an absolute majority of seats and 44.5% of the votes. The Socialist Party, led by Manuel Pizarro, finished with a strong second place, winning 28.6% of the votes and electing 4 councillors. The Social Democratic Party, in coalition with the People's Monarchist Party, which had Álvaro Almeida as its candidate, had its worst result in history in Porto, finishing in third place, with just over 10 percent of the votes and 1 councilor.

Finally, the Unitary Democratic Coalition obtained 5.9 percent, winning 1 councilor, while the Left Bloc obtained 5.3 percent of the votes and failed to gain any seats.

== Electoral system ==
Each party or coalition must present a list of candidates. The winner of the most voted list for the municipal council is automatically elected mayor, similar to first-past-the-post (FPTP). The lists are closed and the seats in each municipality are apportioned according to the D'Hondt method. Unlike in national legislative elections, independent lists are allowed to run.

== Parties and candidates ==
| Party/Coalition | | Political position | Candidate | 2017 result | |
| Party/Coalition | | Political position | Candidate | Votes (%) | Seats |
|---|---|---|---|---|---|
| RM | Rui Moreira – Here there's Porto (Note: Supported by the CDS – People's Party, the Liberal Initiative, the Earth Party and We, the Citizens!.); Rui Moreira – Aqui há Porto | Center-right to right-wing | Rui Moreira | 44.5% | 7 / 13 |
| PS | Socialist Party; Partido Socialista | Centre-left | Tiago Barbosa Ribeiro | 28.6% | 4 / 13 |
| PSD | Social Democratic Party; Partido Social Democrata | Centre-right | Vladimiro Feliz | 10.4% | 1 / 13 |
| PPM | People's Monarchist Party; Partido Popular Monárquico | Right-wing | Diogo Araújo Dantas | 10.4% | 0 / 13 |
| CDU | Unitary Democratic Coalition; Coligação Democrática Unitária PCP, PEV | Left-wing to far-left | Ilda Figueiredo | 5.9% | 1 / 13 |
| BE | Left Bloc; Bloco de Esquerda | Left-wing to far-left | Sérgio Aires | 5.3% | 0 / 13 |
| PAN | People Animals Nature; Pessoas-Animais-Natureza | Centre-left | Bebiana Cunha | 1.9% | 0 / 13 |
| E | Rise Up (Note: In July 2020, the National Renovator Party (PNR) changed its name to Rise Up (E).); Ergue-te | Far-right | Bruno Rebelo | 0.2% | 0 / 13 |
| CH | Enough! Chega! | Right-wing to far-right | António Fonseca | —N/a | —N/a |
| L | FREE; LIVRE | Center-left | Diamantino Raposinho | —N/a | —N/a |
| VP | Volt Portugal; Volt Portugal | Centre to centre-left | André Eira | —N/a | —N/a |

== Opinion polling ==
Exit poll

| Polling firm/Link | Fieldwork date | Sample size | RM | | | PS | PSD | CDU | BE | PAN | L | CH | O | Lead |
| Polling firm/Link | Fieldwork date | Sample size | PNM | CDS | IL | PS | PSD | CDU | BE | PAN | L | CH | O | Lead |
|---|---|---|---|---|---|---|---|---|---|---|---|---|---|---|
| 2021 local election | 26 Sep 2021 | —N/a | 40.7; 6 | | | 18.0; 3 | 17.2; 2 | 7.5; 1 | 6.3; 1 | 2.8; 0 | 0.5; 0 | 3.0; 0 | 4.0; 0 | 22.7 |
| CESOP–UCP | 26 Sep 2021 | 3,957 | 39–44; 6/8 | | | 16–19; 2/3 | 16–19; 2/3 | 6–9; 1 | 5–8; 0/1 | 2–4; 0 | 0–1; 0 | 2–4; 0 | 2–7; 0 | 23– 25 |
| ICS/ISCTE | 26 Sep 2021 | 6,309 | 39.2–44.2; 5/7 | | | 16.5– 20.5; 2/4 | 15.1– 19.1; 1/3 | 5.6– 8.6; 1/2 | 4.9– 7.9; 1/2 | 2.0– 4.0; 0 | – | 1.5– 3.5; 0 | 2.3– 5.3; 0 | 22.7– 23.7 |
| Pitagórica | 26 Sep 2021 | 5,390 | 39.2–45.2; 6/7 | | | 13.7– 19.7; 2/3 | 12.2– 18.2; 2 | 6.5– 10.5; 1 | 5.3– 9.3; 0/1 | 1.2– 5.2; 0 | – | 0.8– 4.8; 0 | 2.1– 6.1; 0 | 25.5 |
| Intercampus | 26 Sep 2021 | 4,106 | 40.1–44.9; 6/8 | | | 15.5– 19.5; 1/3 | 14.9– 18.9; 1/3 | 5.4– 9.0; 0/2 | 5.1– 8.1; 0/2 | 1.24– 4.4; 0 | – | 1.0– 4.0; 0 | 3.5– 4.4; 0 | 24.6– 25.4 |
| Pitagórica | 15–20 Sep 2021 | 600 | 52.7; 8/9 | | | 15.3; 2 | 11.5; 1/2 | 6.1; 0/1 | 4.1; 0 | 2.9; 0 | 0.7; 0 | 2.7; 0 | 4.0; 0 | 37.4 |
| CESOP–UCP | 16–19 Sep 2021 | 1,041 | 45; 7/8 | | | 17; 2/3 | 14; 1/3 | 7; 1 | 4; 0 | 3; 0 | 1; 0 | 3; 0 | 6; 0 | 28 |
| Pitagórica | 2–5 Sep 2021 | 601 | 52.8; 9 | | | 15.7; 2 | 14.0; 2 | 5.8; 0 | 3.5; 0 | 2.2; 0 | —N/a | 1.8; 0 | 4.2; 0 | 37.1 |
| Aximage | 12–19 Aug 2021 | 820 | 59; 9 | | | 12; 2 | 12; 2 | 6; 0 | 4; 0 | 2; 0 | —N/a | 1; 0 | 4; 0 | 47 |
| ICS/ISCTE | 26 Jun–10 Jul 2021 | 800 | 45; 7 | | | 25; 4 | 8; 1 | 8; 1 | 5; 0 | 2; 0 | 1; 0 | 1; 0 | 5; 0 | 20 |
| 2019 Legislative election | 6 Oct 2019 | —N/a | —N/a | 4.2 (0) | 2.8 (0) | 30.5 (5) | 34.2 (6) | 6.5 (1) | 11.0 (1) | 3.6 (0) | 1.6 (0) | 0.4 (0) | 2.5 (0) | 3.7 |
| 2019 EP election | 26 May 2019 | —N/a | —N/a | 8.2 (1) | 2.1 (0) | 28.6 (4) | 23.5 (4) | 6.4 (1) | 11.5 (2) | 6.0 (1) | 2.8 (0) | 0.6 (0) | 5.6 (0) | 5.1 |
| 2017 local election | 1 Oct 2017 | —N/a | 44.5; 7 | | —N/a | 28.6; 4 | 10.4; 1 | 5.9; 1 | 5.3; 0 | 1.9; 0 | —N/a | —N/a | 3.4; 0 | 15.9 |

== Results ==
=== Municipal Council ===
Summary of the 26 September 2021 Municipal Council elections results in Porto
| Parties | Votes | % | ±pp swing | Councillors | |
| Parties | Votes | % | ±pp swing | Total | ± |
|---|---|---|---|---|---|
| Rui Moreira – Here there's Porto | 41,167 | 40.72 | ▼3.8 | 6 | ▼1 |
| Socialist | 18,201 | 18.00 | ▼10.5 | 3 | ▼1 |
| Social Democratic | 17,426 | 17.24 | ▲6.9 | 2 | ▲1 |
| Unitary Democratic Coalition | 7,609 | 7.53 | ▲1.6 | 1 | 0 |
| Left Bloc | 6,323 | 6.25 | ▲0.9 | 1 | ▲1 |
| Chega | 2,980 | 2.95 | —N/a | 0 | —N/a |
| People–Animals–Nature | 2,819 | 2.79 | ▲0.9 | 0 | 0 |
| LIVRE | 462 | 0.46 | —N/a | 0 | —N/a |
| Volt Portugal | 423 | 0.42 | —N/a | 0 | —N/a |
| People's Monarchist | 212 | 0.21 | —N/a | 0 | 0 |
| Rise Up | 80 | 0.08 | ▼0.1 | 0 | 0 |
| Total valid | 97,702 | 96.64 | ▼0.4 | 13 | 0 |
| Blank ballots | 2,251 | 2.23 | ▲0.6 | | |
| Invalid ballots | 1,148 | 1.14 | ▼0.3 | | |
| Total | 101,101 | 100.00 | | | |
| Registered voters/turnout | 207,129 | 48.81 | ▼4.9 | | |
Source: Porto 2021 election results

=== Municipal Assembly ===
Summary of the 26 September 2021 Porto Municipal Assembly elections results
Graph of the party split among 39 seats.
| Parties | Votes | % | ±pp swing | Seats | |
| Parties | Votes | % | ±pp swing | Total | ± |
| Rui Moreira – Here there's Porto | 34,900 | 34.52 | ▼4.3 | 15 | ▼1 |
| Socialist | 19,386 | 19.18 | ▼8.0 | 8 | ▼3 |
| Social Democratic | 18,767 | 18.56 | —N/a | 8 | ▲3 |
| Unitary Democratic Coalition | 8,497 | 8.41 | ▲1.6 | 3 | 0 |
| Left Bloc | 7,630 | 7.55 | ▲0.9 | 3 | 0 |
| People–Animals–Nature | 3,732 | 3.69 | ▲0.9 | 1 | 0 |
| Chega | 3,440 | 3.40 | —N/a | 1 | —N/a |
| LIVRE | 633 | 0.63 | —N/a | 0 | —N/a |
| People's Monarchist | 275 | 0.27 | —N/a | 0 | 0 |
| Alliance | 202 | 0.20 | —N/a | 0 | —N/a |
| Rise Up | 106 | 0.10 | —N/a | 0 | —N/a |
| Total valid | 97,568 | 96.52 | ▲0.2 | 39 | 0 |
| Blank ballots | 2,339 | 2.31 | ▲0.6 | | |
| Invalid ballots | 1,182 | 1.17 | ▼0.4 | | |
| Total | 101,089 | 100.00 | | | |
| Registered voters/turnout | 207,129 | 48.80 | ▼4.9 | | |
Source: Porto 2021 election results

=== Parish Assemblies ===
Results of the 26 September 2021 Porto Parish Assembly elections
| Parish | % | S | % | S | % | S | % | S | % | S | % | S | % | S | Total S |
| Parish | RM | | PSD | | PS | | BE | | CDU | | CH | | PAN | | Total S |
|---|---|---|---|---|---|---|---|---|---|---|---|---|---|---|---|
| Aldoar, Foz do Douro e Nevogilde | 36.9 | 8 | 27.5 | 6 | 15.2 | 3 | 6.2 | 1 | 5.0 | 1 | 4.3 | - | | | 19 |
| Bonfim | 24.7 | 5 | 22.2 | 5 | 21.2 | 4 | 9.9 | 2 | 10.0 | 2 | 3.4 | - | 4.5 | 1 | 19 |
| Campanhã | | | 20.5 | 4 | 43.0 | 10 | 8.4 | 1 | 11.8 | 2 | 5.4 | 1 | 5.6 | 1 | 19 |
| Cedofeita, Santo Ildefonso, Sé, Miragaia, São Nicolau e Vitória | 25.6 | 6 | 18.7 | 4 | 21.1 | 4 | 12.0 | 2 | 9.7 | 2 | 3.2 | - | 4.7 | 1 | 19 |
| Lordelo do Ouro e Massarelos | 32.2 | 7 | 21.5 | 5 | 18.0 | 4 | 7.3 | 1 | 8.9 | 2 | 4.0 | - | 3.0 | - | 19 |
| Paranhos | 22.1 | 5 | 32.0 | 8 | 20.9 | 5 | 7.6 | 2 | 7.0 | 1 | 2.7 | - | 3.8 | - | 21 |
| Ramalde | 31.4 | 7 | 20.2 | 5 | 22.2 | 5 | 7.9 | 1 | 6.8 | 1 | 3.6 | - | 3.8 | - | 19 |
| Total | 29.1 | 38 | 23.7 | 36 | 22.8 | 35 | 8.4 | 10 | 8.2 | 11 | 3.7 | 1 | 3.6 | 3 | 135 |
Source: Election Results
