= 2017 Porto local election =

Portuguese municipal election

2017 Porto local elections
- 1 October 2017

All 13 Councillors in the Porto City Council 7 seats needed for a majority
- Opinion polls
- Turnout: 53.7% ▲1.1 pp
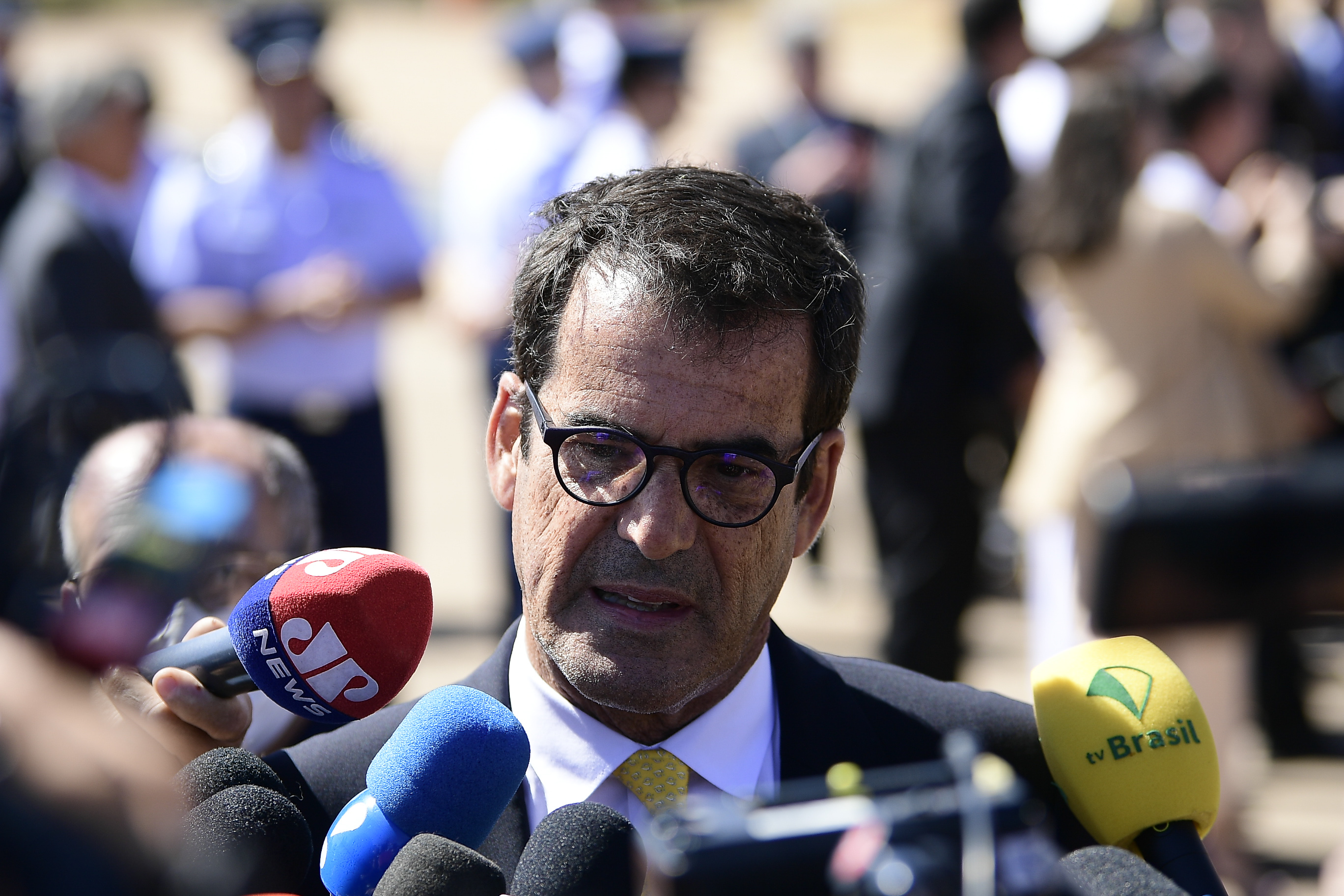

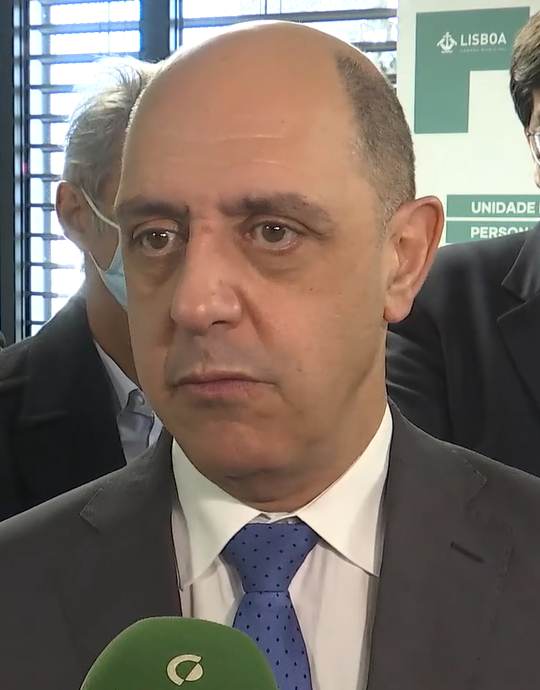

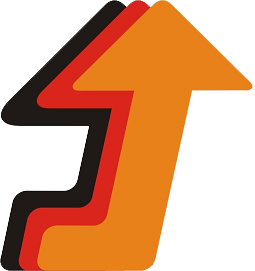

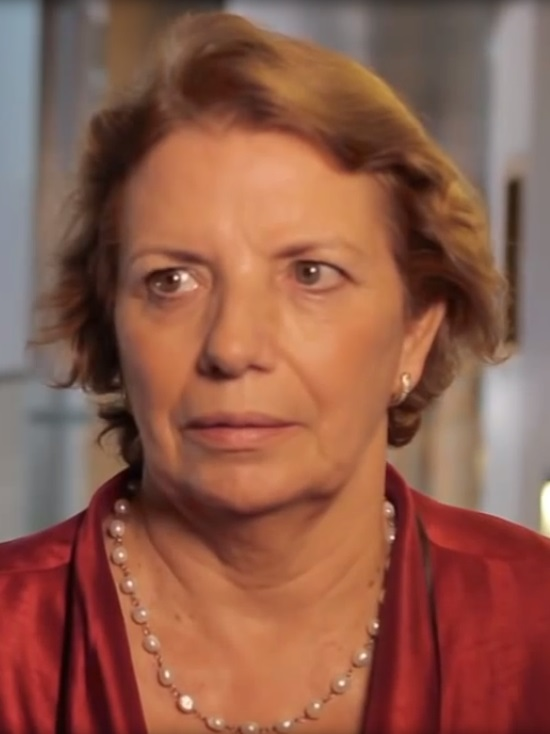
	First party	Second party
Leader	Rui Moreira	Manuel Pizarro
Party	Independent	PS
Alliance	Porto, Our Party
Last election	6 seats, 39.3%	3 seats, 22.7%
Seats won	7	4
Seat change	▲1	▲1
Popular vote	51,159	32,856
Percentage	44.5%	28.6%
Swing	▲5.2 pp	▲5.9 pp
	Third party	Fourth party
Leader	Álvaro Almeida	Ilda Figueiredo
Party	PSD	PCP
Alliance	Authentic Porto (Note: Coalition with PPD/PSD and PPM.)	CDU
Last election	3 seats, 21.1%	1 seat, 7.4%
Seats won	1	1
Seat change	▼2	Steady
Popular vote	11,952	6,781
Percentage	10.4%	5.9%
Swing	▼10.7 pp	▼1.5 pp
Mayor before election
Rui Moreira
Independent
Elected mayor
Rui Moreira
Independent

The 2017 Porto local election was held on 1 October 2017 to elect the members of the Porto City Council.

Rui Moreira, mayor since 2013, won a second term as Mayor of Porto, winning a majority in the city council. He beat the Socialist candidate, once again Manuel Pizarro, who managed to increase his voting share and to gain 1 councillor.

The Social Democratic Party, in coalition with the People's Monarchist Party, had a terrible result, losing more than half of the votes from 2013 and electing one single councillor. The Communist Party, with Ilda Figueiredo as its candidate, managed to keep its seat in the City Council, despite a slight loss in the vote share. Meanwhile, the Left Bloc, with João Teixeira Lopes as its candidate after João Semedo withrew his candidacy for health reasons, failed once again to gain any seat in the city council.

== Background ==
In the 2013 election, Rui Moreira, an independent politician, managed to win the election, despite not winning an absolute majority. The Socialist Party, led by Manuel Pizarro, achieved second place with 3 seats and about 22% of the votes, being followed by the Social Democratic Party, led by Luís Filipe Menezes, who also elected 3 seats and got 21% of the votes. The Unitary Democratic Coalition got 1 seat and 7.4% of the votes.

Rui Moreira governed with support from the Socialist Party, who intended to support Rui Moreira's independent movement in 2017. Despite that, Rui Moreira declined the support of the Socialist Party and, in response, the Socialists ended the government agreement with the independent movement.

== Electoral system ==
Each party or coalition must present a list of candidates. The winner of the most voted list for the municipal council is automatically elected mayor, similar to first-past-the-post (FPTP). The lists are closed and the seats in each municipality are apportioned according to the D'Hondt method. Unlike in national legislative elections, independent lists are allowed to run.

== Parties and candidates ==
Party/Coalition		Political position	Candidate	2013 result	
Party/Coalition		Political position	Candidate	Votes (%)	Seats
RM	Porto, Our Party 2017 (Note: Supported by the CDS – People's Party, the Earth Party and We, the Citizens!.); Porto, O nosso Partido 2017	Center-right to right-wing	Rui Moreira	39.3%	6 / 13
PS	Socialist Party; Partido Socialista	Centre-left	Manuel Pizarro	22.7%	3 / 13
PSD-PPM	Authentic Porto; Porto Autêntico PSD, PPM	Centre-right	Álvaro Almeida	21.1%	3 / 13
CDU	Unitary Democratic Coalition; Coligação Democrática Unitária PCP, PEV	Left-wing to far-left	Ilda Figueiredo	7.4%	1 / 13
BE	Left Bloc; Bloco de Esquerda	Left-wing to far-left	João Teixeira Lopes	3.6%	0 / 13
PTP	Portuguese Labour Party; Partido Trabalhista Português	Center-left	José Manuel Pereira	0.2%	0 / 13
PAN	People Animals Nature; Pessoas-Animais-Natureza	Centre-left	Bebiana Cunha	—N/a	—N/a
PPV/CDC	Citizenship and Christian Democracy; Cidadania e Democracia Cristã	Right-wing	Orlando Cruz	—N/a	—N/a
PNR	National Renovator Party; Partido Nacional Renovador	Far-right	Sandra Martins	—N/a	—N/a

== Opinion polling ==
Exit poll

Polling firm/Link	Fieldwork date	Sample size	RM	CDS	PSD PPM	PS	CDU	BE	O	Lead
2017 local election	1 Oct 2017	—N/a	44.5; 7		10.4; 1	28.6; 4	5.9; 1	5.3; 0	5.4; 0	15.9
UCP–CESOP	1 Oct 2017	11,592	43–48; 6/8		8–10; 1	28–31; 4/5	6–8; 0/1	5–7; 0/1	–	15– 17
Eurosondagem	1 Oct 2017	7,657	37.7–42.0; 7		7.7– 11.0; 1	30.3– 34.0; 5	4.8– 7.2; 0/1	4.8– 7.2; 0/1	–	7.4– 8.0
Intercampus	1 Oct 2017	4,354	42.0–47.0; 6/7		8.1– 11.1; 1/2	27.7– 31.7; 4/5	5.0– 8.0; 0/1	4.2– 7.2; 0/1	1.0– 7.0; 0	14.3– 15.3
Eurosondagem	24–26 Sep 2017	725	40.8; 6/7		11.0; 1/2	30.8; 4/5	6.9; 1	5.4; 0/1	5.1; 0	10.0
UCP–CESOP	23–25 Sep 2017	1,239	34; 5/6		9; 1/2	34; 5/6	8; 1	7; 0/1	8; 0	Tie
Aximage	16–19 Sep 2017	600	39.9; 6/7		11.8; 2	20.8; 3/4	8.9; 1	5.3; 0/1	13.3; 0	19.1
UCP–CESOP	16–17 Sep 2017	1,239	34; 4/6		13; 1/2	33; 4/6	8; 1	6; 0/1	6; 0	1
Eurosondagem	19–21 Jul 2017	1,525	46.9; 7		12.1; 2	22.5; 3	8.2; 1	5.5; 0	4.8; 0	24.4
Eurosondagem	15–17 May 2017	1,011	44.8; 6/7		15.1; 2	22.2; 3	6.9; 1	6.0; 0/1	5.0; 0	22.6
2015 Legislative election	4 Oct 2015	—N/a	—N/a	38.5 (6)		32.6 (5)	8.4 (1)	11.4 (1)	6.1 (0)	5.9
2014 EP election	25 May 2014	—N/a	—N/a	29.7 (5)		29.8 (5)	12.5 (2)	5.5 (0)	15.9 (1)	0.1
2013 local election	29 Sep 2013	—N/a	39.3; 6		21.1; 3	22.7; 3	7.4; 1	3.6; 0	6.0; 0	16.6

== Results ==
=== Municipal Council ===
Summary of the 1 October 2017 Municipal Council elections results in Porto
Parties	Votes	%	±pp swing	Councillors	
Parties	Votes	%	±pp swing	Total	±
Porto, Our Party 2017	51,159	44.46	▲5.2	7	▲1
Socialist	32,856	28.55	▲5.9	4	▲1
Social Democratic / People's Monarchist	11,952	10.39	▼10.7	1	▼2
Unitary Democratic Coalition	6,781	5.89	▼1.5	1	0
Left Bloc	6,146	5.34	▲1.7	0	0
People–Animals–Nature	2,215	1.92	—N/a	0	—N/a
PPV/CDC	186	0.16	—N/a	0	—N/a
National Renovator	173	0.15	—N/a	0	—N/a
Labour	166	0.14	▼0.1	0	0
Total valid	111,634	97.01	▲1.4	13	0
Blank ballots	1,826	1.59	▼0.9		
Invalid ballots	1,613	1.40	▼0.5		
Total	115,073	100.00			
Registered voters/turnout	214,324	53.69	▲1.1		
Source: Porto 2017 election results

=== Municipal Assembly ===
Summary of the 1 October 2017 Porto Municipal Assembly elections results
Parties	Votes	%	±pp swing	Seats	
Parties	Votes	%	±pp swing	Total	±
Porto, Our Party 2017	44,614	38.78	▲4.1	16	▲1
Socialist	31,238	27.16	▲3.5	11	▲1
Social Democratic / People's Monarchist	15.156	13.18	▼7.1	8	▼3
Unitary Democratic Coalition	8,748	7.60	▼2.3	3	▼1
Left Bloc	8,281	7.20	▲2.2	3	▲1
People–Animals–Nature	3,195	2.78	—N/a	1	—N/a
Total valid	111,232	96.70	▲1.8	39	0
Blank ballots	1,991	1.73	▼1.2		
Invalid ballots	1,809	1.57	▼0.5		
Total	115,032	100.00			
Registered voters/turnout	214,324	53.67	▲1.1		
Source: Porto 2017 election results

=== Parish Assemblies ===
Results of the 1 October 2017 Porto Parish Assembly elections
Parish	%	S	%	S	%	S	%	S	%	S	Total S
Parish	RM		PS		PSD/PPM		CDU		BE		Total S
Aldoar, Foz do Douro e Nevogilde	50.2	10	21.4	4	15.5	3	4.9	1	5.0	1	19
Bonfim	35.7	8	28.7	6	15.5	3	8.4	1	8.0	1	19
Campanhã	26.7	5	40.2	9	11.5	2	10.3	2	6.4	1	19
Cedofeita, Santo Ildefonso, Sé, Miragaia, São Nicolau e Vitória	33.8	7	28.6	6	14.0	3	8.4	1	10.8	2	19
Lordelo do Ouro e Massarelos	42.8	9	25.3	5	12.6	2	8.9	2	6.7	1	19
Paranhos	26.4	6	24.9	6	30.6	7	6.9	1	6.5	1	21
Ramalde	39.0	8	29.2	6	14.6	3	6.3	1	6.9	1	19
Total	35.7	53	28.1	42	17.4	23	7.6	9	7.2	8	135
Source: Election Results

== Maps ==
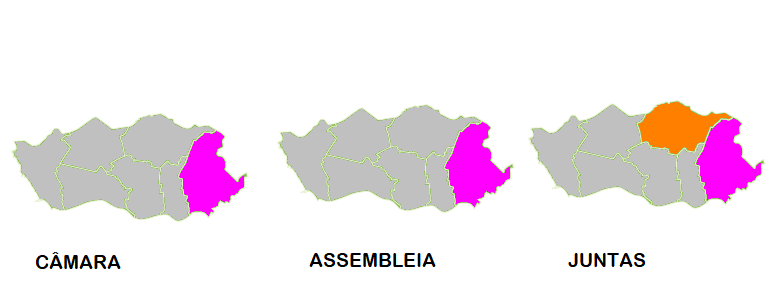
Most voted party by Parish.
