= Miguel Corte-Real (politician) =

Portuguese business manager and right wi g politician

Shadow Minister of State Reform
- Incumbent
- Assumed office 19 September 2025
- Leader: André Ventura
- Preceded by: Office established

Member of the Porto City Council
- Incumbent
- Assumed office 12 October 2025

Member of the Porto Municipal Assembly
- In office 26 September 2021 – 2 May 2024

Personal details
- Born: 05/08/1985 (age 40) Porto, Portugal
- Party: CH (since 2025)
- Other political affiliations: PPD/PSD (2002–2025)
- Children: 4
- Occupation: Business manager • Politician

Miguel Corte-Real (born 5 August 1985) is a Portuguese business manager and politician, who currently serves as Shadow Minister of State Reform in the Shadow Cabinet of André Ventura. Corte-Real was chosen as the right wing party Chega candidate, for the 2025 Porto local election. He secured his election as a Councilor, a position he currently holds. He also led the Social Democratic Party in the Porto Municipal Assembly between 2021 and 2024.
