= António Borges =

Portuguese economist and banker (1949 – 2013)

Director of the European Department of the International Monetary Fund
- In office November 2010 – November 2011

Vice Chairman of Goldman Sachs International
- In office September 2000 – June 2008

Dean at INSEAD
- In office 1993–2000

Vice Governor of Banco de Portugal
- In office 1990–1993

Personal details
- Born: António Mendo de Castel-Branco do Amaral Osório Borges; 18 November 1949 Ramalde, Porto, Portugal
- Died: 25 August 2013 (aged 63) Lisbon, Portugal
- Party: Social Democratic Party
- Education: Technical University of Lisbon; Stanford University

António Mendo de Castel-Branco do Amaral Osório Borges (18 November 1949 – 25 August 2013) was a Portuguese economist and banker. He was also a Managing Director and International Adviser of Goldman Sachs.

== Biography ==
=== Early years to year 2000 ===
Borges was born in Ramalde, Porto. He received his bachelor's degree in economics from the Technical University of Lisbon in 1972, and his master's degree from Stanford University. In 1980 he received his Ph.D in Economics from Stanford University. Later Borges taught at INSEAD and assumed the position of Dean of the MBA program from 1986 to 1988. He returned to Portugal in 1990, where he served as Vice Governor of the Banco de Portugal while teaching at the Nova School of Business and Economics at the Universidade Nova de Lisboa. While Vice Governor of the Banco de Portugal, Borges took a leading role in the liberalization of Portugal's financial system. From 1993 to 2000 Borges served as a director and dean at INSEAD.

=== 2000 to 2010 ===
In 2000 Borges relocated to London, where he became Executive Vice Chairman of Goldman Sachs International, responsible for Strategy, Investment Banking and Leadership Development. In this period Borges was a Director of Citibank Portugal, BNP Paribas, Petrogal, Sonae, Jerónimo Martins, Cimpor, Vista Alegre, Novartis Venture Funds, CNP Assurances, Banco Santander de Negocios, Caixa Seguros, Scor, S.P.G.S and Heidrick & Struggles. Borges left his post as Vice Chairman of Goldman Sachs International in 2008, while continuing as a Managing Director of Goldman Sachs Group Inc and as an International Advisor of Goldman Sachs. After his departure, Borges served as Chairman of the Statutory Fiscal Board of Banco Santander de Negócios Portugal, Chairman of the Supervisory Board of Banco Santander de Negocios Portugal, Chairman of the European Corporate Governance Institute, and Chairman of the Hedge Fund Standards Board Ltd. He was also a member of the Supervisory Boards of Novartis Venture Fund and CNP Assurances SA, the Advisory Board of Critical Links SA, and the Board of Governors of Wellington College. He was simultaneously an adviser to the United States Department of the Treasury, the Electric Power Research Institute, the OECD, and the European Union on the establishment of the Economic and Monetary Union (EMU). Borges was also an adviser to the Portuguese government, and a professor at the Institute of Economics and Business at the Catholic University of Portugal. A member of the Social Democratic Party (PSD), Borges was Vice Chairman of the National Policy Committee of the PSD from 2008 to 2010.

=== 2010 and death ===
In November 2010, Borges was appointed Director of the European Department of the International Monetary Fund. In November 2011 he was appointed by the new Prime Minister Pedro Passos Coelho to oversee the privatization measures, renogitations of public–private partnerships and restructuring of state-owned enterprises and the banking sector. These are measures negotiated with a troika composed of the European Commission, the European Central Bank and the International Monetary Fund as preconditions for monetary aid to Portugal.

On 25 August 2013, Borges died from pancreatic cancer at the age of 63.
