= Tower of Pedro-Sem =

Tower in Portugal

- Torre de Pedro-Sem
- Porto, Grande Porto, Norte in Portugal
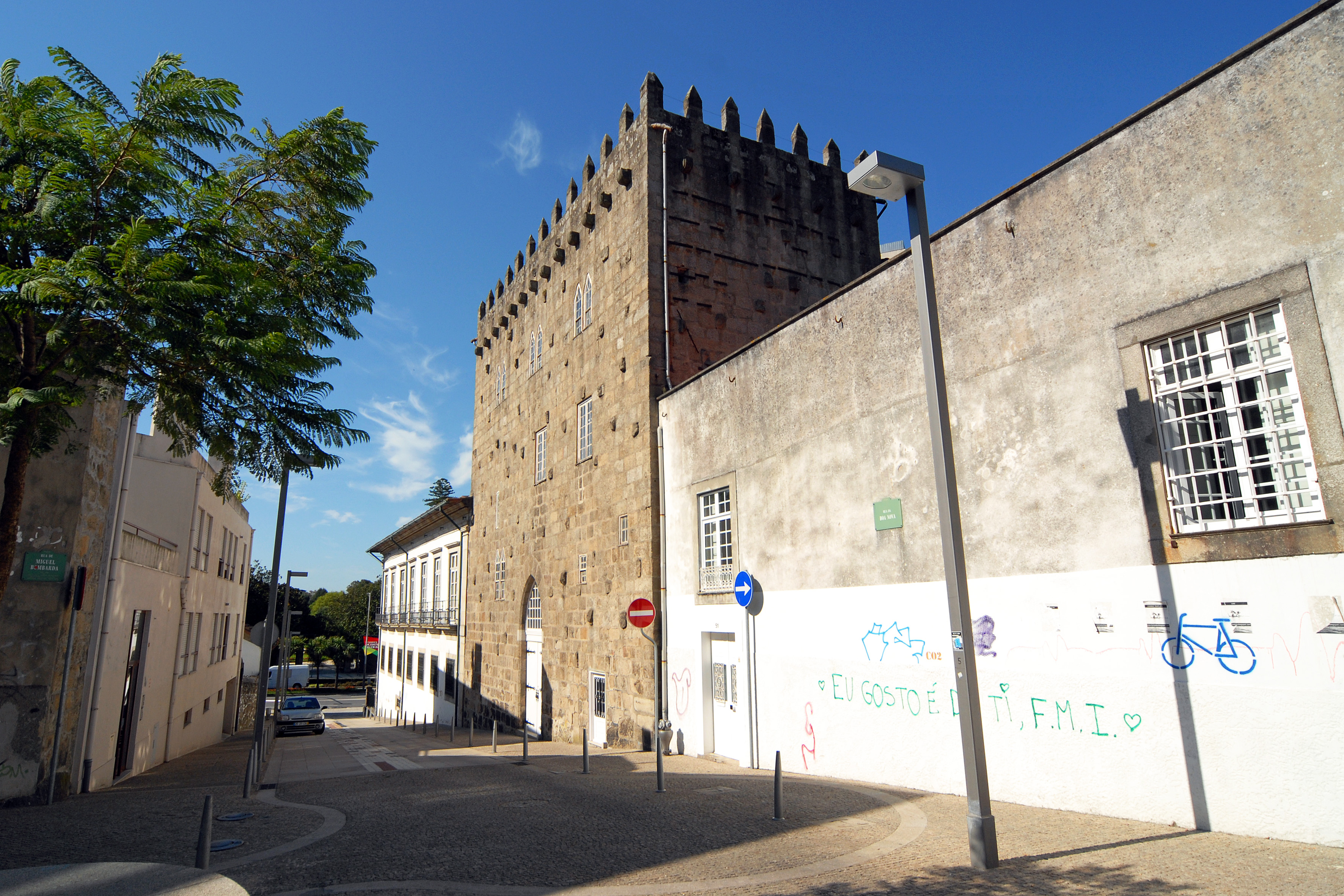
- An oblique view of the Pedro-Sem tower along the Rua da Boa Nova

Site information
- Type: Fortification
- Owner: Portugal
- Operator: Roman Catholic Diocese of Porto
- Open to the public: Private

Location
- Coordinates: 41°8′57″N 8°37′30″W

Site history
- Built: 14th century
- Materials: Granite

The Tower of Pedro-Sem (Portuguese: Torre do Palácio dos Terenas/Torre de Pedro-Sem/Torre da Marca) is a medieval fortification situated in the civil parish of Lordelo do Ouro e Massarelos, that protected the northern Portuguese city of Porto.

== History ==
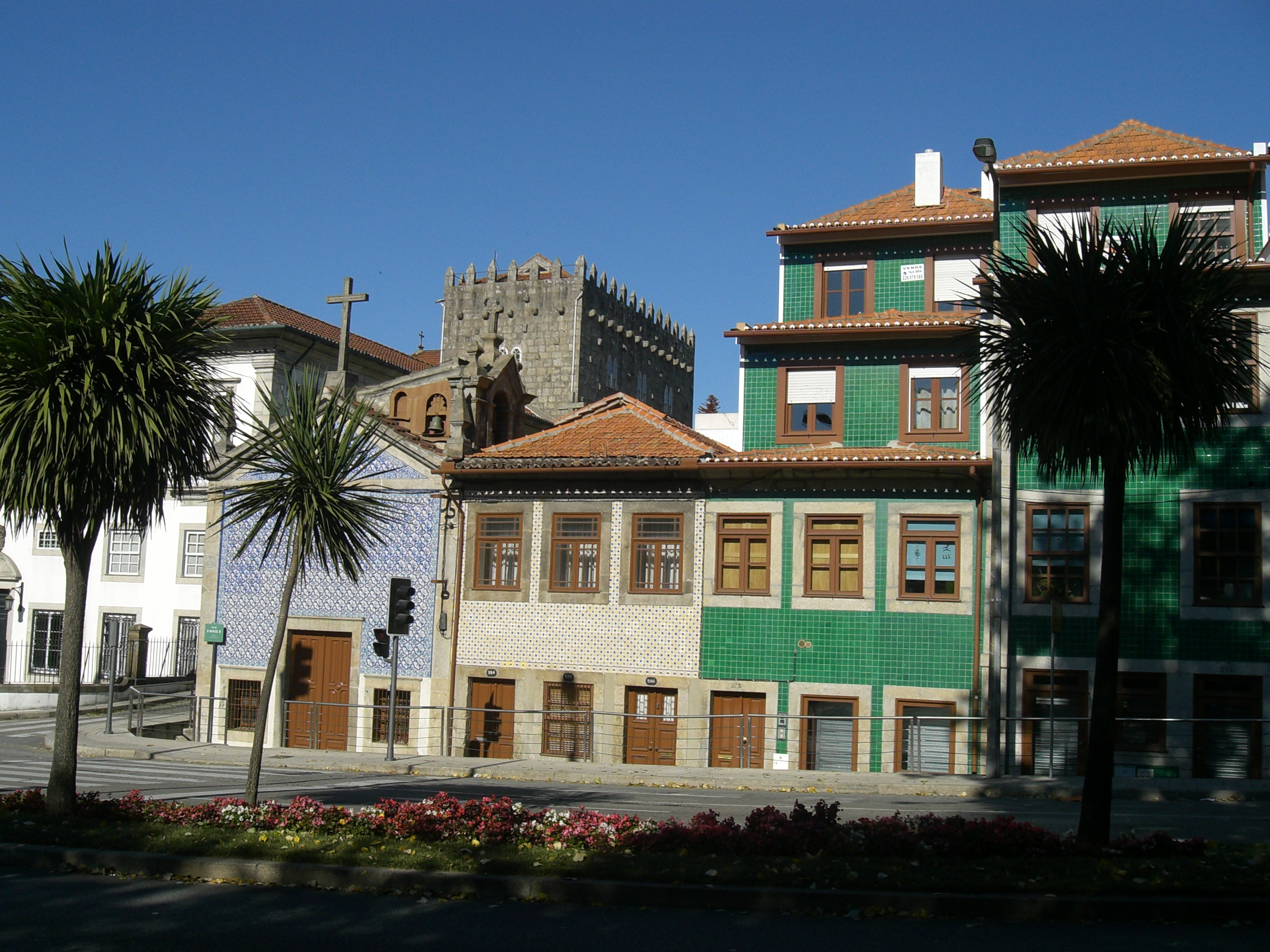
A glimpse of the Tower over the medieval-like buildings of the old quarter

The tower was ordered constructed by Pedro de Sem, chancellor under King D. Afonso IV in the first half of the 14th century. Before being integrated into the former-Palácio dos Terenas, this monument was part of the defensive wall ordered constructed in the first half of the 14th century, that also served as the centre of a pre-urban estate related to the medieval burg. It was a prestigious structure used by the monarch to affirm his presence to the city. By 1431, in the possession of Marim do Sem (sometimes known as Martim d'Océm), then-chancellor of King D. Duarte (and great-grandson of Pero de Sem), who would eventually be buried in São Domingos de Santarém (his tomb was later transferred to the Museum of São João de Alporão), was the estate of Pero Sem and its tower.

Between 1454 and 1516, following the death of one of Pero de Sem descendant the tower passed into the hands of João Sanches (Sanchez) and his wife Isabel Brandão (Brandoa), daughter of João Brandão, accountant in the estate of Porto. This would be the beginning of a long relationship within the hands of the Brandão family, until the end of the 19th century (along with various urban palaces in Porto). By 1576, Rui Brandão Sanches instituted a family majorat that included the estate and tower, along with their other possessions.

A palace was constructed alongside the tower in the 18th century by the Brandãos, and by the 19th century the tower became the possession of the Counts and Marquesses of Terena, eventually the Marques of Monfalim.

The primitive space, on the periphery of the city, was already under-pressure from the urban sprawl and the old Quinta da Boa Vista, as it was known by the 15th century. It is in this context that the construction of the 17th-century palace occurred, based on a monumental facade and two floors, fronting on a square. The importance of the square placed the medieval square into a secondary utility. It was preserved by a late Baroque project, owing to its symbolic importance.

In 1919 it was acquire, along with the palace, by the Diocese of Porto, to serve as the Episcopal Palace, while the Municipal Council of Porto used the old Episcopal Palace (between 1916 and 1956)., following a series of events from the establishment of the Republic. It was later used as the official residence of the prelate of Porto, before being transformed into the Centro de Cultura Católica (Catholic Cultural Centre).

In 1986, the Diocese recuperated the interior of the tower, to serve as residences, under the project of architect Abrunhosa de Brito, which he presented to the Municipal Council, designated Torre da Marca (Tower of Mark). Later, in 1995, the Fundação SPES, an organization established folllwoing the death D. António Ferreira Gomes, Bishop of Porto began functioning from the site, as referred to develop "a civilization od Love and Beauty". The museums and historical patrimony division of the city indicated their support to the project, even as the property was known as the Torre das Terenas.

== Architecture ==
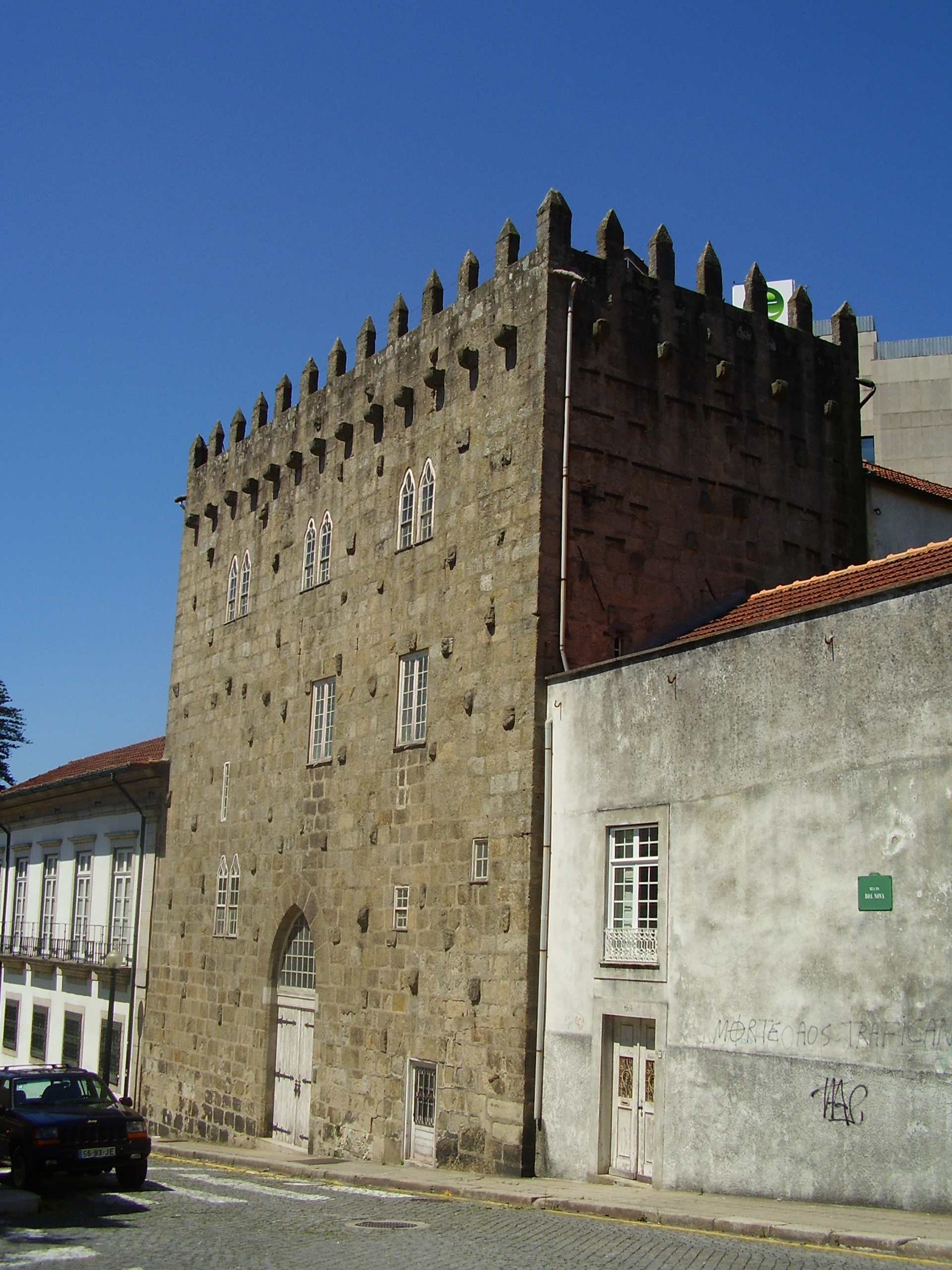
The austere facade of the medieval fortress

The urban structure consists of a group of architectural elements, such the former-Palace of Monfalim and Terena in the old quarter of Porto. To the south is situated the public gardens of the Palácio de Cristal (Crystal Palace) where the former-Torre da Marca was situated. The Torre da Marca was the landmark that indicated the terminus to navigation, constructed by King D. John III in 1542 to orient ships along the Douro, and was erroneously assigned to the Torre dos Terenas or Torre de Pedro-Sem.

The tower, although suffering various alterations over the centuries, maintains a medieval appearance. The rectangular tower, is marked by an eastern portico at the ground floor, in addition to a smaller secondary rectangular opening. The first floor includes two small rectangular friezes and additional twin-trilobed windows. Meanwhile, on the second are rectangular windows, that substitute older panes. The entire tower is covered in merlons surmounting machillations. The other facades are covered by the 18th-century palace grounds, and only visible from the last floor (along the southern and western views) that include twined and trilobal windows, particularly along the eastern wall.

A 1986 intervention was responsible for a complete transformation of the interior, in addition to the ceiling tile. Little is known about the former interior.
