= Porto, Our Movement =

Porto, Our Movement Porto, o Nosso Movimento
- Abbreviation: FA (2025); RM (2017–2021); II (2013)
- Leader: Filipe Araújo
- Founder: Rui Moreira
- Founded: 20 March 2013; 13 years ago
- Ideology: Liberal conservatism
- Political position: Centre-right to right-wing
- City Council: 0 / 13
- Municipal Assembly: 2 / 39
- Parishes: 0 / 7

Website
- portoonossomovimento.pt

Porto, Our Movement (Portuguese: Porto, o Nosso Movimento) is a grassroots movement from the city of Porto, the second largest city in Portugal. It was founded by Rui Moreira in order to run for the 2013 local election. The movement has had the support of the CDS – People's Party from 2013 to 2021 and of the Liberal Initiative in the 2021 election.

Rui Moreira was elected Mayor of Porto for the first time in 2013, being re-elected in 2017 and 2021. In 2025, the movement decided to run again in that year's local elections, selecting Deputy Mayor Filipe Araújo as their candidate, but was mostly wiped out from the city's local government branches.

== Names ==
Throughout the years, Porto, Our Movement, ran under different names in the local elections:

- 2013: Porto, Our Party (Portuguese: Porto, o Nosso Partido)
- 2017: Porto, Our Party 2017 (Portuguese: Porto, o Nosso Partido 2017)
- 2021: Rui Moreira – Here there's Porto (Portuguese: Rui Moreira – Aqui há Porto)
- 2025: Filipe Araújo: Do it as Porto (Portuguese: Filipe Araújo: Fazer à Porto)

== Election results ==
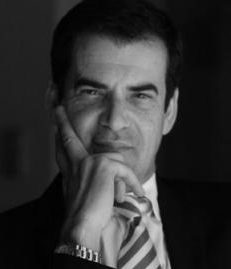
Rui Moreira, the movement's founder and Mayor of Porto from 2013 to 2025

=== Municipal Council ===
Election	Leader	Votes	%	Seats	+/-	Government
2013	Rui Moreira	45,411	39.3 (#1)	6 / 13		Minority
2017	Rui Moreira	51,159	44.5 (#1)	7 / 13	▲1	Majority
2021	Rui Moreira	41,167	40.7 (#1)	6 / 13	▼1	Minority
2025	Filipe Araújo	5,842	5.1 (#4)	0 / 13	▼6	No seats

=== Municipal Assembly ===
Election	Main candidate	Votes	%	Seats	+/-
2013	Daniel Bessa	40,134	34.7 (#1)	15 / 39	
2017	Miguel Pereira Leite	44,614	38.8 (#1)	16 / 39	▲1
2021	Sebastião Feyo de Azevedo	34,900	34.5 (#1)	15 / 39	▼1
2025	António Agostinho Guedes	6,139	5.3 (#5)	2 / 39	▼13
