= Manuel Pizarro (politician) =

Portuguese politician (born 1964)

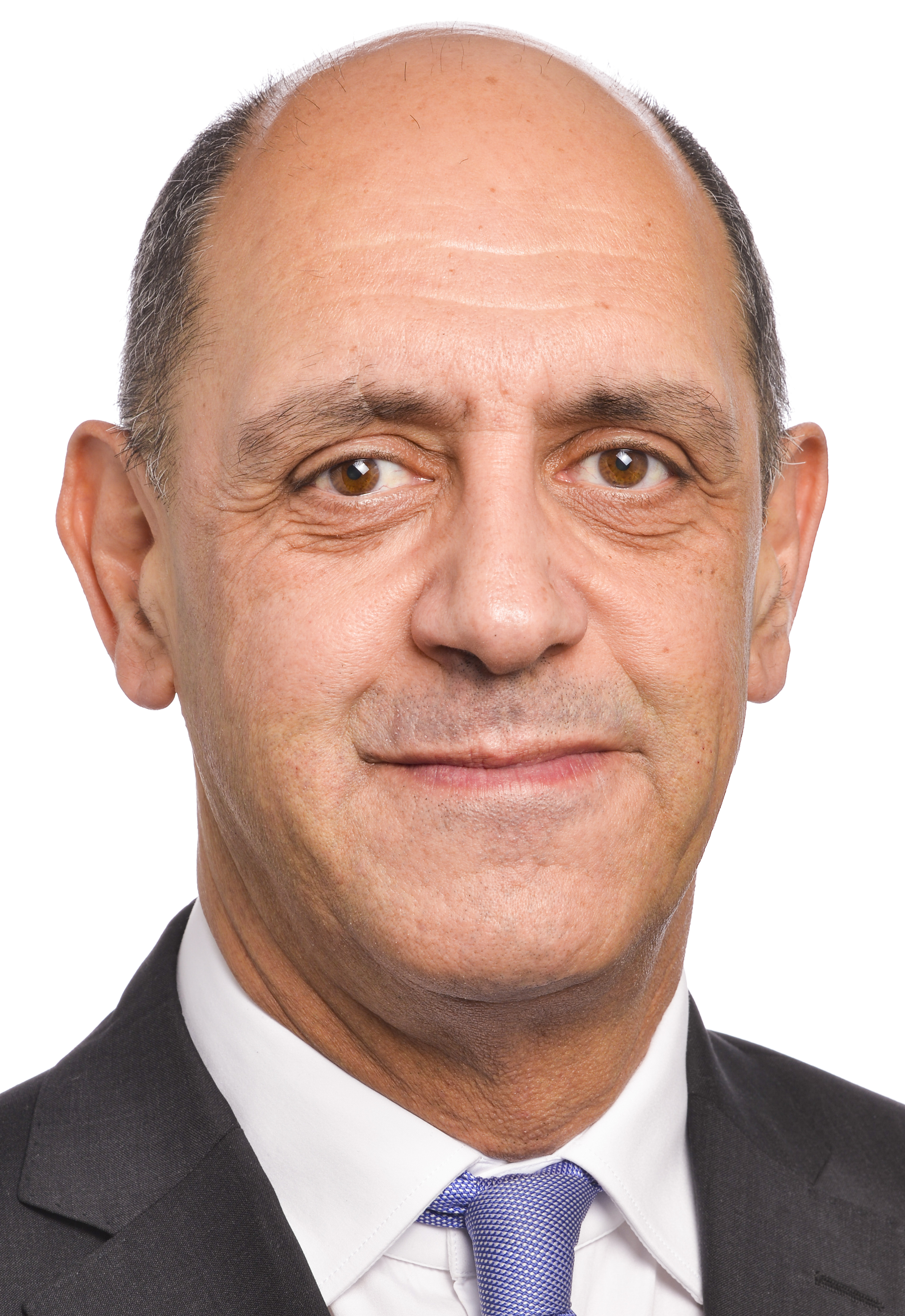
- Official portrait as an MEP, 2019

Minister of Health
- In office 10 September 2022 – 2 April 2024
- Prime Minister: António Costa
- Preceded by: Marta Temido
- Succeeded by: Ana Paula Martins

Member of the Assembly of the Republic
- In office 26 March 2024 – 3 June 2025
- Constituency: Porto
- In office 10 March 2005 – 22 October 2015
- Constituency: Porto

Member of the European Parliament
- In office 2 July 2019 – 10 September 2022
- Constituency: Portugal

Member of the Porto City Council
- In office 29 September 2013 – 26 September 2021
- In office 9 October 2005 – 30 January 2008

Member of the Porto Municipal Assembly
- In office 16 December 2001 – 9 October 2005

Member of the Ramalde Parish Assembly
- In office 12 December 1982 – 16 December 2001

Personal details
- Born: Manuel Francisco Pizarro de Sampaio e Castro; 2 February 1964 (age 62) Coimbra, Portugal
- Party: PS (1993–present)
- Other political affiliations: PCP (1978–1990)
- Spouse: Alexandra Pinto
- Education: University of Porto
- Occupation: Doctor • Politician

Manuel Francisco Pizarro de Sampaio e Castro (born 2 February 1964) is a Portuguese politician of the Socialist Party who served as Minister of Health in Prime Minister António Costa's third cabinet from 2022 to 2024. He previously was a Member of the European Parliament from 2019 to 2022.

== Political career ==
Pizarro started his political career as a member of the Parish Council in Ramalde, Porto, firstly as a member of the Portuguese Communist Party and, from 1993, as a member of the Socialist Party. He was firstly elected to parliament after the 2005 legislative election, being a candidate in Porto District.

He ran for mayor of Porto twice, firstly in 2013 and secondly in 2017, losing both times to Rui Moreira.

=== Member of the European Parliament, 2019–2022 ===
Pizzaro was elected as Member of the European Parliament after the 2019 European elections. In parliament, he served on the Committee on Employment and Social Affairs and the Committee on Fisheries.

In addition to his committee assignments, Pizzaro was part of the parliament's delegation for relations with Brazil. He was also a member of the European Parliament Intergroup on Trade Unions and the URBAN Intergroup.

=== Minister of Health, 2022–2024 ===
In September 2022, Pizzaro was appointed by Prime Minister António Costa to replace Marta Temido as Minister of Health, joining the XXIII Constitutional Government.

On May 18, 2023, the Portuguese state broadcaster Rádio e Televisão de Portugal reported that Pizarro was under investigation by the Portuguese Public Prosecution Service.

== Other activities ==
- UNITE – Parliamentary Network to End HIV/AIDS, Viral Hepatitis and Other Infectious Diseases, Member (since 2019)
