= Pedro Duarte (politician) =

Portuguese jurist and politician (born 1973)

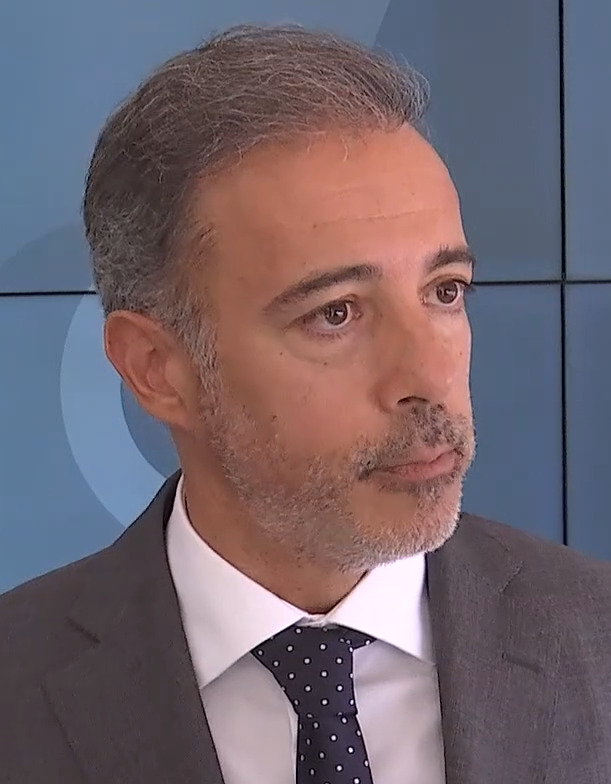
- Duarte in 2024

Mayor of Porto
- Incumbent
- Assumed office 5 November 2025
- Preceded by: Rui Moreira

Secretary of State for Youth
- In office 21 July 2004 – 12 March 2005
- Prime Minister: Pedro Santana Lopes
- Preceded by: Hermínio Loureiro
- Succeeded by: Laurentino Dias

President of the Social Democratic Youth
- In office 5 September 1998 – 29 September 2002
- Preceded by: Jorge Moreira da Silva
- Succeeded by: Jorge Nuno de Sá

Member of the Assembly of the Republic
- In office 12 March 2005 – 19 June 2011
- Constituency: Porto
- In office 25 October 1999 – 21 July 2004
- Constituency: Porto

Minister of Parliamentary Affairs
- In office 2 April 2024 – 5 June 2025
- Prime Minister: Luís Montenegro
- Preceded by: Ana Catarina Mendes
- Succeeded by: Carlos Abreu Amorim

Personal details
- Born: Pedro Miguel de Azeredo Duarte; 12 July 1973 (age 53) Porto, Portugal
- Party: Social Democratic Party
- Other political affiliations: Social Democratic Youth
- Spouse: Ana Duarte
- Education: Catholic University of Portugal
- Occupation: Jurist • Politician

Pedro Miguel de Azeredo Duarte (born 12 July 1973) is a Portuguese jurist and politician. He has been Minister of Parliamentary Affairs since 2024, in the XXIV Constitutional Government, led by Luís Montenegro.

He served as a member of the Assembly of the Republic between 1999 and 2011, elected for the Social Democratic Party.

He has a degree in law from Universidade Católica Portuguesa and a master's degree in International Economics and European Studies from ISEG - Lisbon School of Economics and Management.

Pedro Duarte led the Social Democratic Youth National Political Commission from 1998 to 2002. He chaired the Parliamentary Committee on Youth and Sports, between 1999 and 2001, when he was an MP, and on Education, Science and Culture, from 2002 to 2004. He was a member of the NATO Parliamentary Assembly.

He was also vice-president of the PSD Parliamentary Group and of the YEPP Youth Bureau of the European People's Party, between 2003 and 2005. He was Secretary of State for Youth in the XVI Constitutional Government, led by Pedro Santana Lopes. Between 2011 and 2024 he was the Director of Corporate Affairs at Microsoft Portugal.

After having directed the campaign for Luís Filipe Menezes' defeated candidacy for the Porto mayorship in 2013, he was in charge of directing Marcelo Rebelo de Sousa's campaign for the 2016 presidential campaign, won by Marcelo in the first round.
