= Rui Moreira =

Portuguese businessman and politician (born 1956)

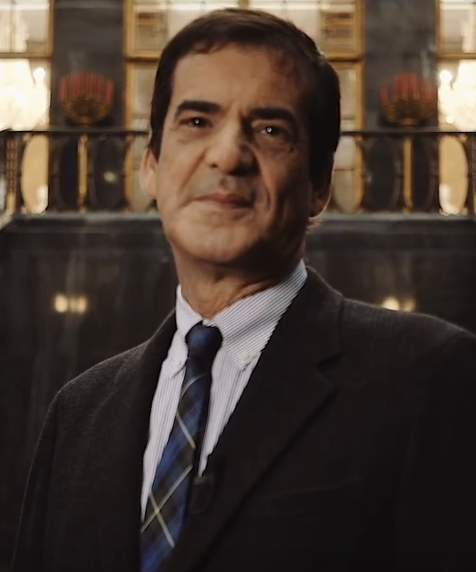
- Rui Moreira in 2017

Mayor of Porto
- In office 22 October 2013 – 05 November 2025
- Deputy: Guilhermina Rego (2013–2017); Rui Loza (2017); Filipe Almeida Araújo (2017–2025)
- Preceded by: Rui Rio
- Succeeded by: Pedro Duarte

President of the Porto Commercial Association
- In office April 2001 – 28 June 2013
- Preceded by: Vergílio Folhadela Moreira
- Succeeded by: Rui Ferreira Marques

Personal details
- Born: Rui de Carvalho de Araújo Moreira; 8 August 1956 (age 70) Porto, Portugal
- Party: Independent
- Education: University of Greenwich
- Occupation: Businessman • politician

Rui de Carvalho de Araújo Moreira (born 8 August 1956) is a Portuguese businessman and politician, Mayor of Porto from 2013 to 2025. While officially an independent, he was supported by the CDS – People's Party since 2013 and the Liberal Initiative since 2021.

== Biography ==
Moreira was born in Porto. One of his great-grandfathers was Adolfo Höfle, a wealthy German migrant and employer of João Augusto Ferreira de Almeida, the last man executed by Portugal in 1917. Moreira graduated in Business from London's University of Greenwich, top of his 1978 class. A competitive sailor, he won youth and senior titles and represented Portugal in the sport.

From 2001 to 2013, he was president of the Porto Commercial Association ('ACP'), which is headquartered in the Palácio da Bolsa (Stock Exchange Palace).

From 2004, Moreira represented FC Porto on Trio d'Ataque, an RTP programme with pundits from the Big Three of Portuguese football. He was dismissed from the show in October 2010, after walking off stage during a discussion about the Apito Dourado corruption scandal at his club.

In September 2013, running as an independent allied with the CDS – People's Party, he was elected mayor of Porto. He was re-elected four years later, with an absolute majority. In 2021, his list now including the Liberal Initiative (IL) won the elections but lost its majority, having six of 13 councillors.

Moreira was term-limited from the 2025 Porto local election. He did not endorse the candidacy of his deputy mayor, Filipe Araújo. Araújo came fourth and won no seats. With the CDS–PP and IL having endorsed the winning candidacy of Pedro Duarte, Araújo was only endorsed by People Animals Nature.

== Honours ==
- Grand-Cross of the Order of Civil Merit, Spain (28 November 2016)
