= Campanhã =

- Civil parish
- Coordinates: 41.157°N 8.579°W
- Country: Portugal
- Region: Norte
- Metropolitan area: Porto
- District: Porto
- Municipality: Porto

Area
  - Total: 8.04 km^{2} (3.10 sq mi)

Population (2011)
  - Total: 32,659
  - Density: 4,060/km^{2} (10,500/sq mi)
- Time zone: UTC+00:00 (WET)
  - Summer (DST): UTC+01:00 (WEST)
- Website: http://www.campanha.net/

Campanhã (Portuguese pronunciation: [kɐ̃pɐˈɲɐ̃]) is a Portuguese freguesia ("civil parish"), located in the city of Porto. The population in 2011 was 32,659, in an area of 8.04 km^{2} (3.10 sq mi). Located there are the Campanhã railway station, the most important main line station in Porto, and the adjacent Campanhã metro station.

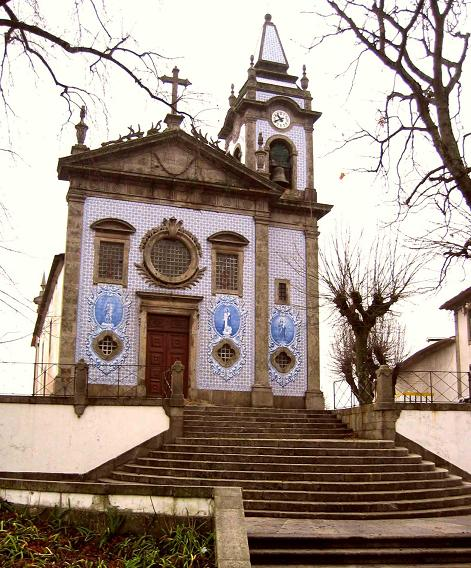
Church of Campanhã
