= Paranhos (Porto) =

- Civil parish
- Coordinates: 41.179°N 8.616°W
- Country: Portugal
- Region: Norte
- Metropolitan area: Porto
- District: Porto
- Municipality: Porto

Area
  - Total: 7.17 km^{2} (2.77 sq mi)

Population (2011)
  - Total: 44,298
  - Density: 6,180/km^{2} (16,000/sq mi)
- Time zone: UTC+00:00 (WET)
  - Summer (DST): UTC+01:00 (WEST)
- Website: http://www.jfparanhos-porto.org/

Paranhos (Portuguese pronunciation: [pɐˈɾɐɲuʃ]) is a parish in the municipality of Porto, Portugal. The population in 2011 was 44,298, in an area of 7.17 km^{2} (2.77 sq mi). Local landmarks include the Areosa Church, various faculties of the University of Porto and the sprawling Hospital de São João (Saint John Hospital). The area was home to association football club S.C. Salgueiros from its foundation in 1911 until 2005.

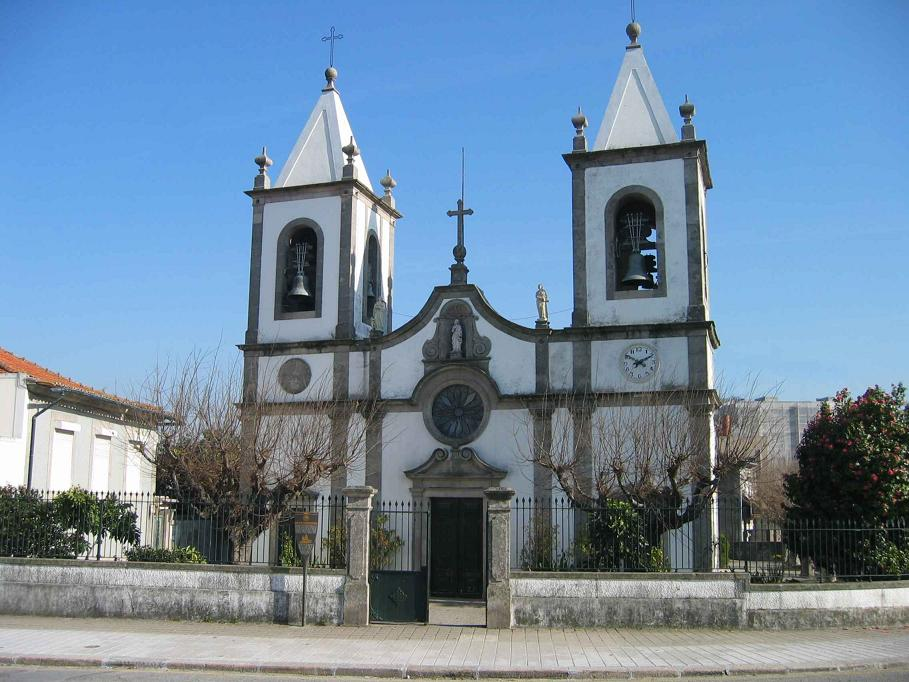
Church of Paranhos
