= Bonfim (Porto) =

- Civil parish
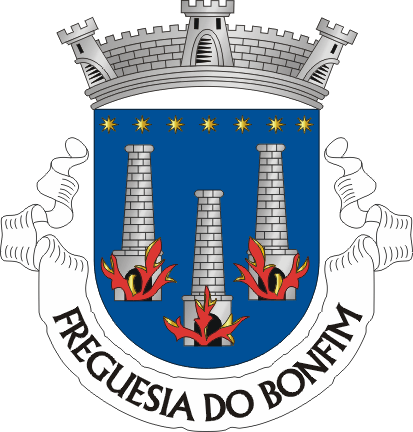
- Coat of arms

- Coordinates: 41.149°N 8.597°W
- Country: Portugal
- Region: Norte
- Metropolitan area: Porto
- District: Porto
- Municipality: Porto

Area
  - Total: 3.10 km^{2} (1.20 sq mi)

Population (2011)
  - Total: 24,265
  - Density: 7,830/km^{2} (20,300/sq mi)
- Time zone: UTC+00:00 (WET)
  - Summer (DST): UTC+01:00 (WEST)

Bonfim (Portuguese pronunciation: [bõˈfĩ]) is a Portuguese parish, located in the municipality of Porto. The population in 2011 was 24,265, in an area of 3.10 km^{2} (1.20 sq mi).

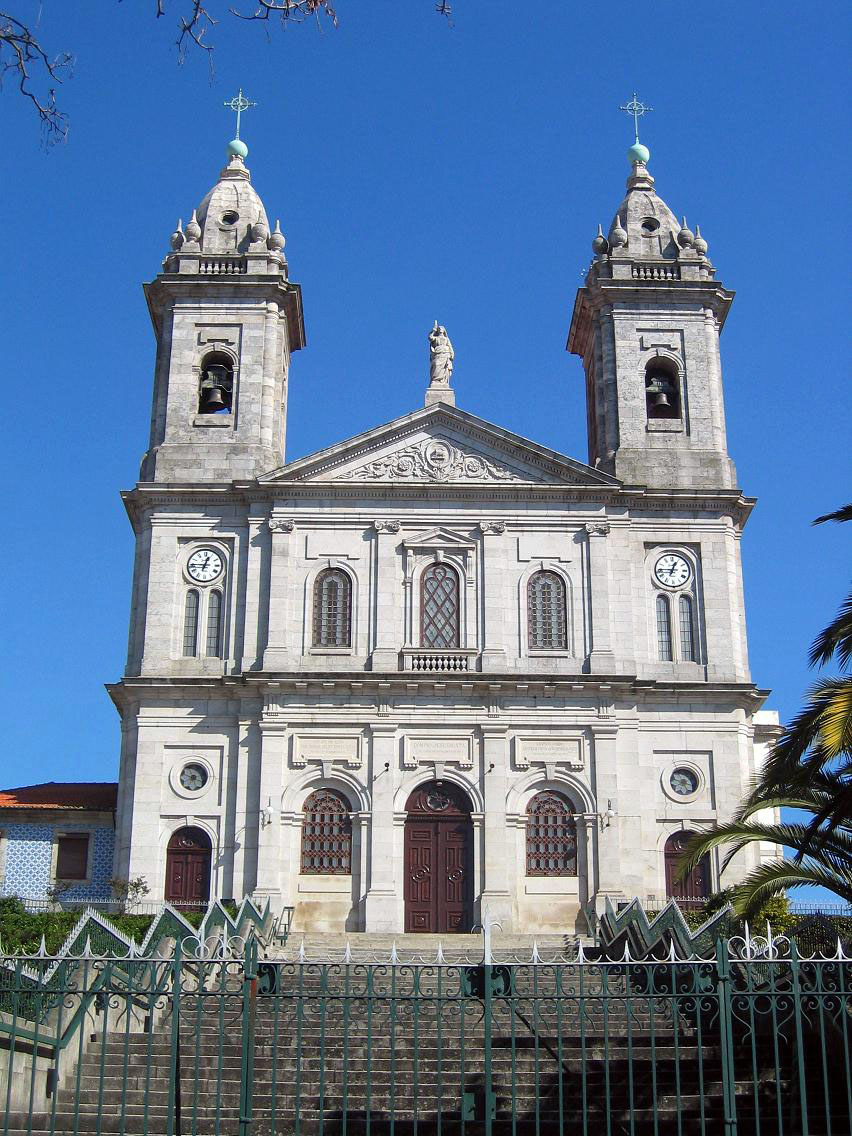
Church of Bonfim.
