= Lordelo do Ouro e Massarelos =

- Civil parish
- Location in Portugal
- Coordinates: 41.160°N 8.658°W
- Country: Portugal
- Region: Norte
- Metropolitan area: Porto
- District: Porto
- Municipality: Porto

Area
  - Total: 5.59 km^{2} (2.16 sq mi)

Population (2011)
  - Total: 29,059
  - Density: 5,200/km^{2} (13,500/sq mi)
- Time zone: UTC+00:00 (WET)
  - Summer (DST): UTC+01:00 (WEST)

Lordelo do Ouro e Massarelos is a civil parish in the municipality of Porto, Portugal. It was formed in 2013 by the merger of the former parishes Lordelo do Ouro and Massarelos. The population in 2011 was 29,059, in an area of 5.59 km^{2} (2.16 sq mi).
