= Ramalde =

- Civil parish
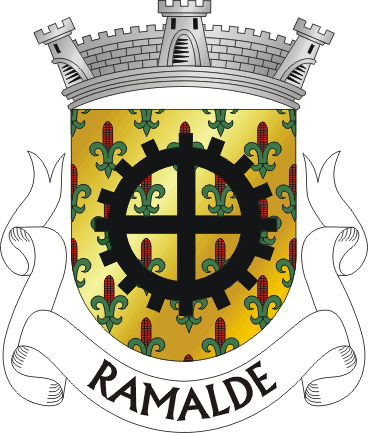
- Coat of arms

- Coordinates: 41.169°N 8.648°W
- Country: Portugal
- Region: Norte
- Metropolitan area: Porto
- District: Porto
- Municipality: Porto

Area
  - Total: 5.83 km^{2} (2.25 sq mi)

Population (2011)
  - Total: 38,012
  - Density: 6,520/km^{2} (16,900/sq mi)
- Time zone: UTC+00:00 (WET)
  - Summer (DST): UTC+01:00 (WEST)
- Website: https://www.jf-ramalde.pt/

Ramalde (Portuguese pronunciation: [ʁɐˈmaldɨ]) is a Portuguese civil parish of the municipality of Porto. The population in 2011 was 38,012, in an area of 5.83 km^{2}.

The Hospital da Prelada, a reputed private hospital of Porto city established in 1988 which operates for the state-run national health service of Portugal, the head office of Portuguese party Iniciativa Liberal (IL) and Boavista FC, a major sports club from Porto whose history is full of important achievements, are all based in Porto's Ramalde civil parish.

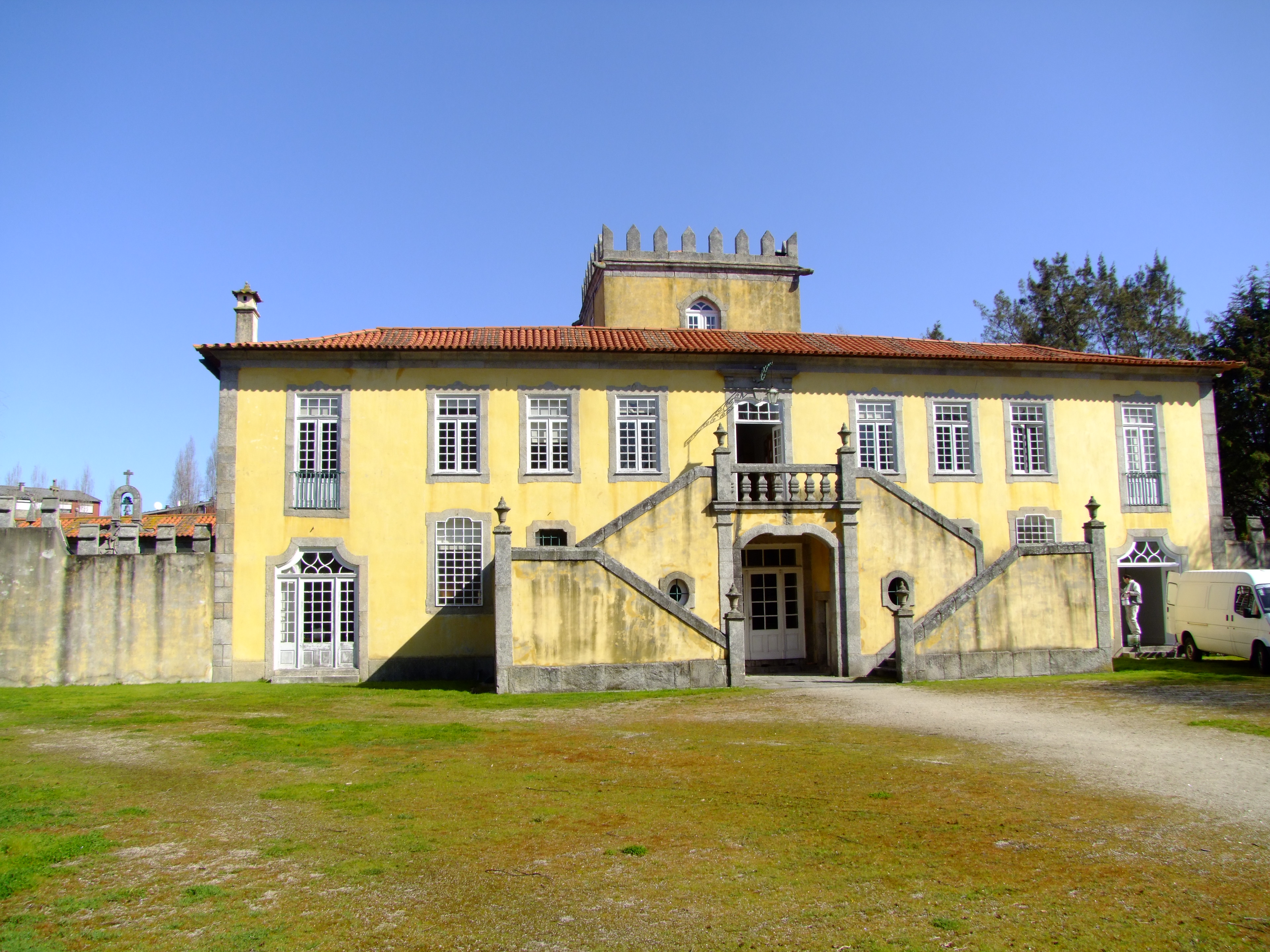
House of Ramalde
