= University of Coimbra General Library =

University library in Coimbra, Portugal

- Biblioteca Geral Da Universidade De Coimbra
- The University of Coimbra General Library main building
- 40.20776121648361°N 8.423980608471227°W
- Location: Coimbra, Portugal
- Type: Academic library

Other information
- Affiliation: University of Coimbra
- Website: https://www.uc.pt/bguc

The University of Coimbra General Library (Portuguese: Biblioteca Geral da Universidade de Coimbra) is the central library system of the University of Coimbra in Coimbra, Portugal. The library includes the historic Biblioteca Joanina and the modern Edifício Novo ("New Building"), which together preserve millions of volumes and archival materials spanning numerous academic disciplines.

The origins of the library predate the permanent transfer of the university from Lisbon to Coimbra in 1537. Records from the early sixteenth century describe a university library known as the Livraria de Estudo ("Study Library"), with inventories from 1513 and 1532 documenting more than 120 manuscript volumes. Following the university's reestablishment in Coimbra in 1537, the library was reorganized for use by students and professors. University statutes issued during the sixteenth century expanded its opening hours and described it as a public library serving lecturers, students, and other users.

In the early eighteenth century, during the reign of King John V of Portugal, the university constructed the Biblioteca Joanina, one of the best-known examples of Baroque architecture in Portugal. Construction began in 1717 and was completed in 1728. The library was named in honor of King João V and became the university's principal library during the eighteenth and nineteenth centuries.

The Biblioteca Joanina is noted for its gilded woodwork, painted ceilings, decorative arches, and exotic woods imported from the Portuguese Empire. A portrait of King João V painted by Italian artist Domenico Duprà is displayed within the library. The library is also known for its long-standing use of bat colonies to help protect books from insects.

In 1901, the institution was renamed the Biblioteca Central da Universidade ("Central Library of the University"), before receiving its present name, Biblioteca Geral da Universidade de Coimbra, in 1924. In 1962, the university opened the Edifício Novo, a modern library building housing the institution's contemporary collections, reading rooms, and research facilities.

The General Library's collections include manuscripts, incunabula, early printed books, and academic works in fields such as law, medicine, theology, philosophy, literature, and history. The Edifício Novo contains more than one million volumes and serves as the university's primary academic research library.

The library forms part of the University of Coimbra – Alta and Sofia UNESCO World Heritage Site, designated in 2013. In 2021, the General Library received the European Heritage Label in recognition of its historical and cultural significance.

== See also ==
- List of libraries in Portugal
