= Biblioteca Joanina =

Coordinates: 40.2071°N 8.4265°W

Biblioteca Joanina Joanine Library
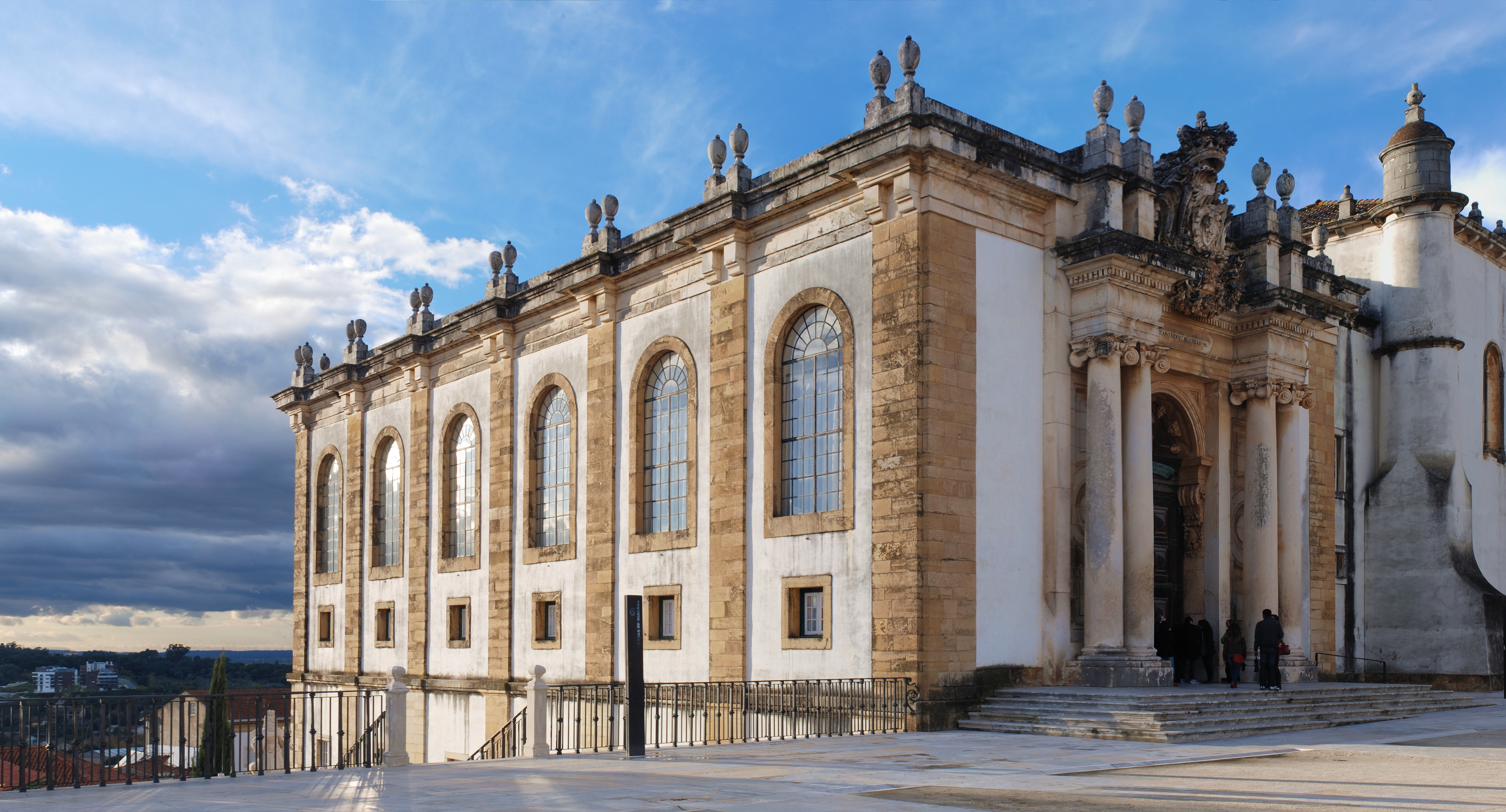
- Main façade
- Location: University of Coimbra; Coimbra, Portugal
- Established: 1717

Collection
- Size: 70,000 volumes
- Building details
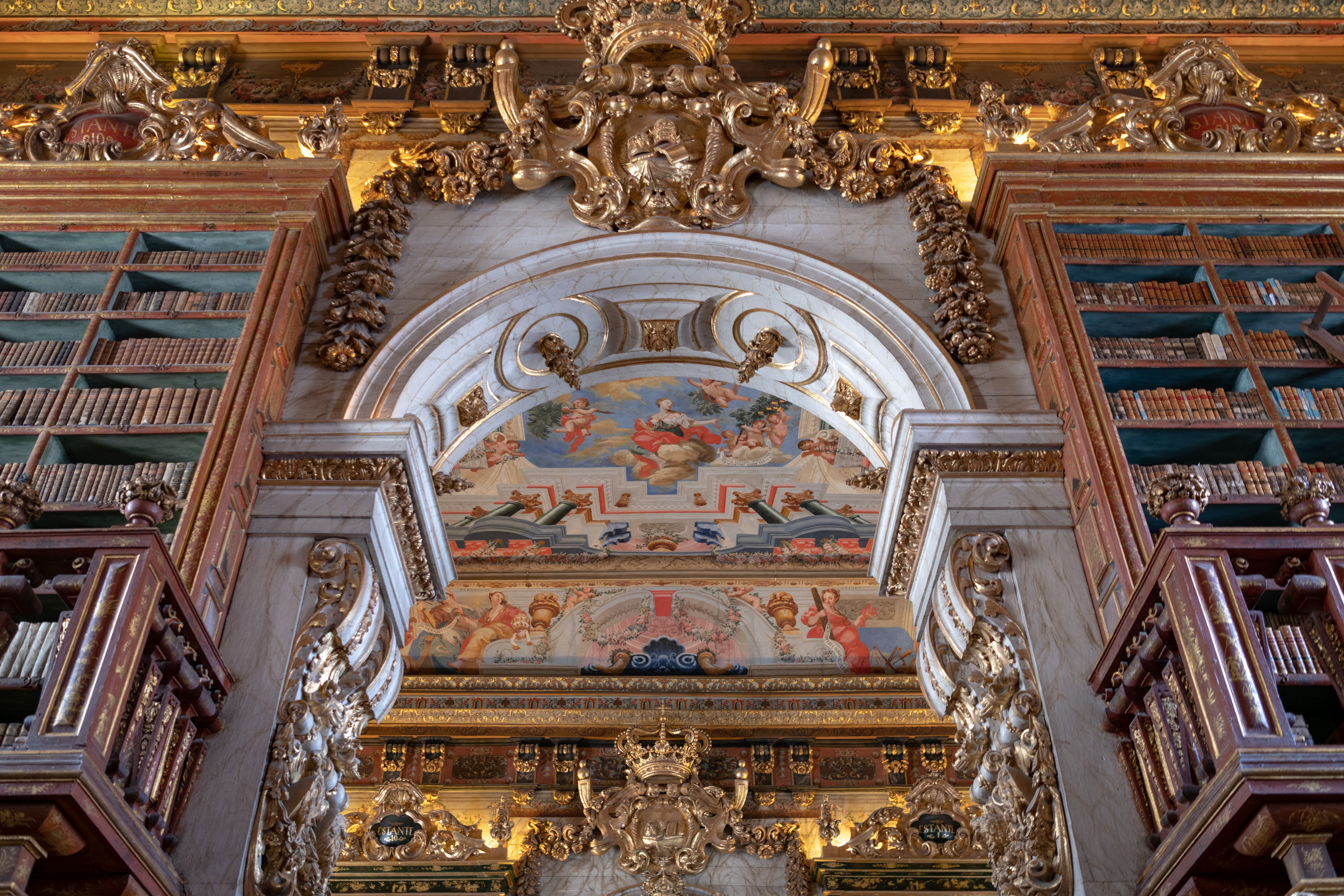
- Reading rooms

Design and construction
- Architect: João Carvalho Ferreira
- Style: Baroque
- Construction: 1717–1728

The Biblioteca Joanina, sometimes known in English as the Joanine Library, is a Baroque library in Coimbra, Portugal, located at the heart of the University of Coimbra. The Biblioteca Joanina is regularly considered one of the most beautiful libraries in the world.

The Biblioteca Joanina is named after its founder, King John V of Portugal, who began construction on the library in 1717, during the onset of the Age of Enlightenment in Europe. It is home to more than 70,000 volumes, including many priceless, historical documents and first editions. It is registered as a National Monument.

== History ==
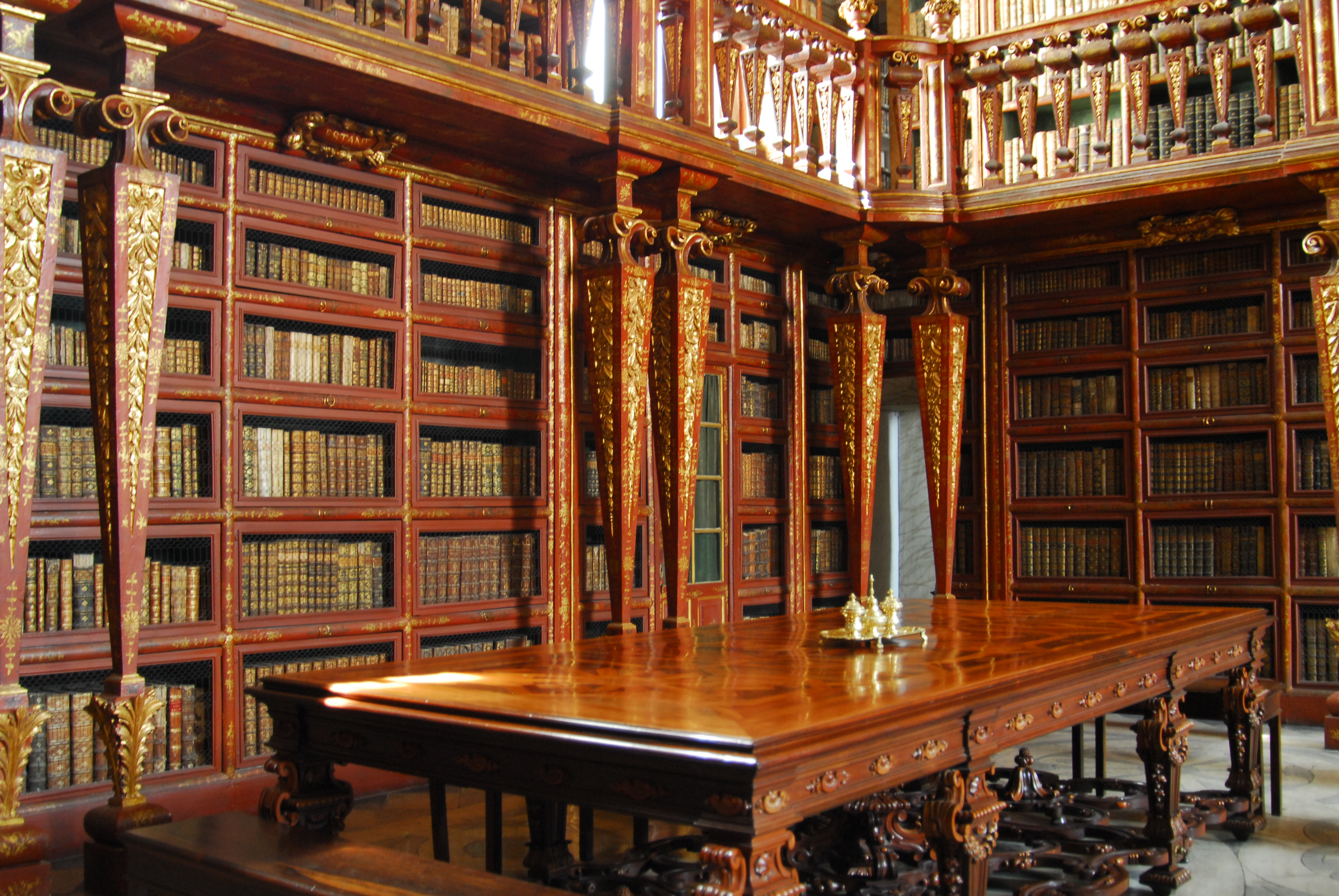
One of the reading desks.

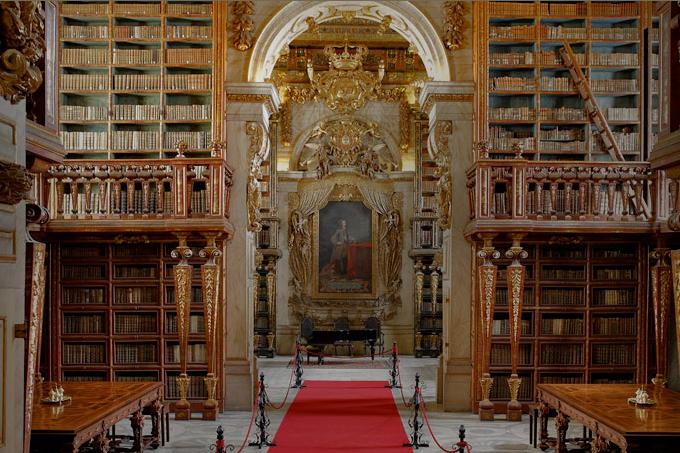
View of the Domenico Duprà portrait of King John V of Portugal.

The Casa da Livraria (House of the Library), the name that it was known, received its first books in 1750, its construction completed between 1717 and 1728.

== Architecture ==
The building has three floors and shelters about 200,000 volumes, of which 40,000 are located on the first floor. These bibliographic collections can be consulted, by request, with justification and motives for the need to consultation. Upon approval, the referenced work is taken to the Biblioteca Geral by a staff member, where the document can be examined.

The care taken in this respect is a direct consequence of the rarity and age of the documents in the library; the collection date from the 16th, 17th and 18th centuries, whose majority represent the best works from Europe at the time. The library contains about 250 thousand volumes, namely works of medicine, geography, history, humanistic studies, science, civil and canon law, philosophy and theology.

=== Design ===
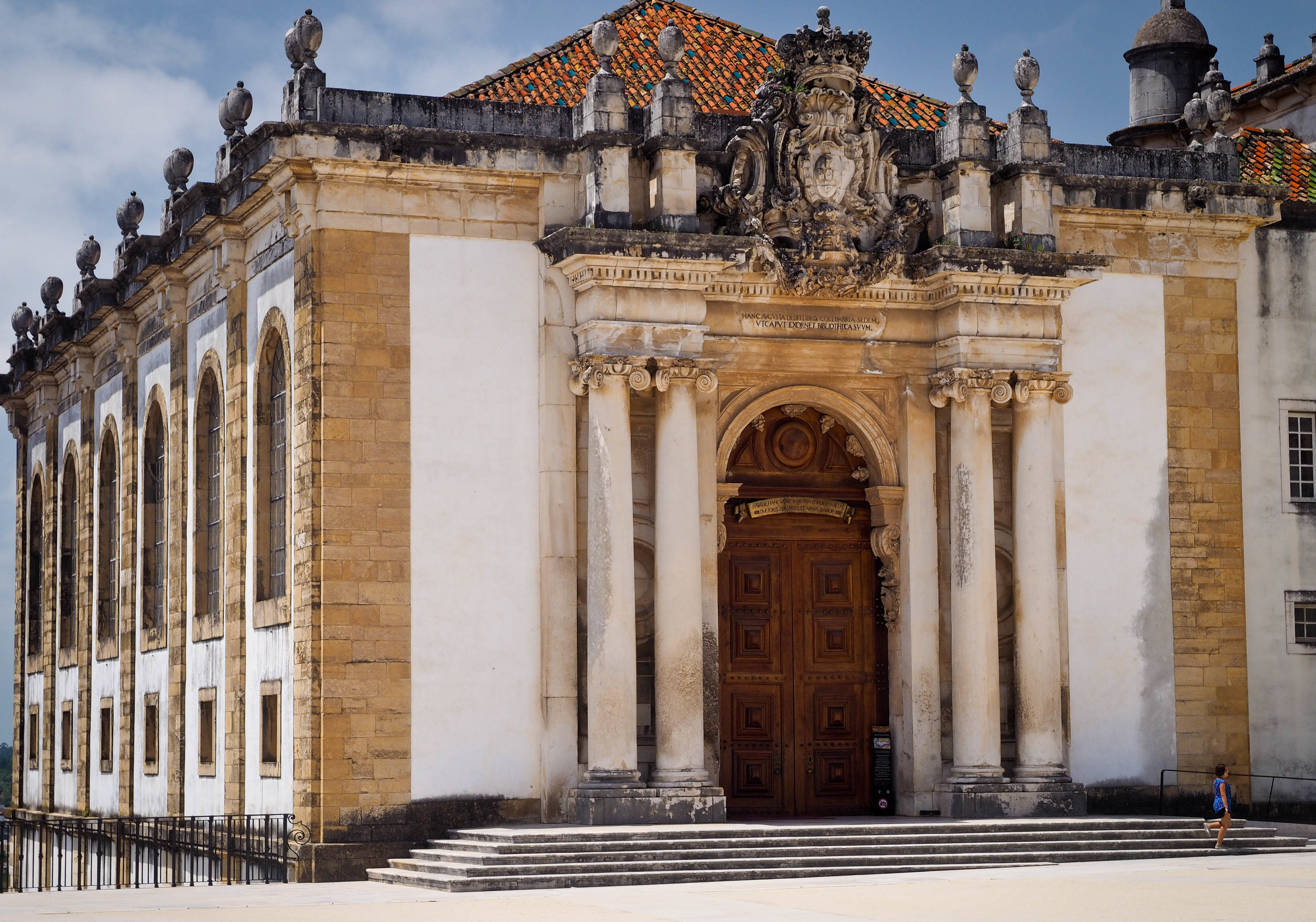
View of the monumental façade.

The artistry of the library is characterized by its international origin and emphasizes the global reach of the Portuguese Empire. Chinoiserie motifs painted on exotic South American wood were entirely executed by Portuguese artists, with the notable exception being the monumental portrait of King John V of Portugal, executed by Domenico Duprà in 1725.

Over the entrance door, the library exhibits the national coat of arms. Inside, there are three great rooms divided by decorated arches, bearing the same style as the portal and entirely executed by Portuguese artists.

The walls are covered by two storied shelves, in gilded or painted exotic woods (primarily from Brazil); the painted ceilings, by the Lisbon artists Simões Ribeiro and Vicente Nunes, blend harmoniously with the rest of the decoration.

== Book preservation ==
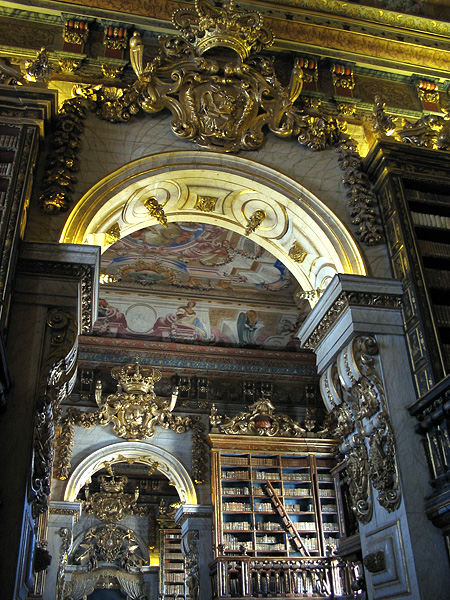
Interior of the library.

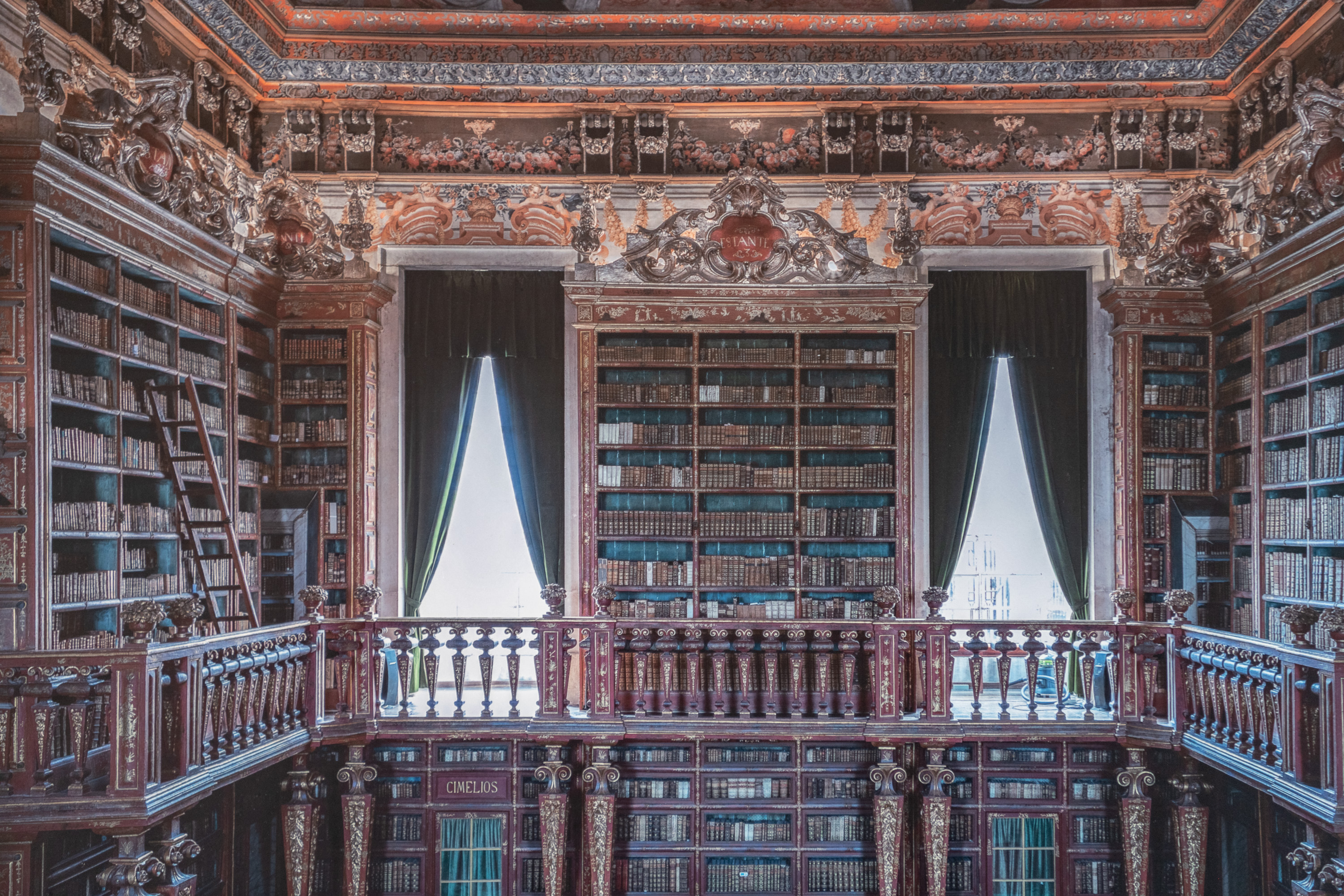
Shelves of the library.

All the bibliographic works are in the best condition since the building is a perfect vault, with a stable environment, throughout the year, from summer to winter. The building was conceived as a library house constructed with exterior walls around 2.11 metres (83 in) thick. The door of the "vault" is constructed of teak, that permits the space maintain a constant temperature of 18–20 °C (64–68 °F). To maintain this stable environment the humidity hovers around 60%, thereby conditioning the wood interior. In addition to issues of humidity and temperature, the stacks are affected by another "enemy": papirófagos, insects that survive on paper. But, the structure is protected by being constructed of oak woods, that, in addition to its dense nature (which makes it difficult for wood penetration), elicits an odor that is repellent to these insects.

=== Bats ===
The library is noted as being one of two in the world (the Mafra palace library being the other) whose books are protected from insects by the presence of a colony of bats within the library. During the night, the bats consume the insects that appear, eliminating the pest and assisting the maintenance of the stacks. Each night, workers cover the "buffets" (credenzas) with sheets of leather. In the morning the library is cleaned of bat guano.

== See also ==
- List of libraries in Portugal
