= Almeida Garrett Library =

Library in Portugal

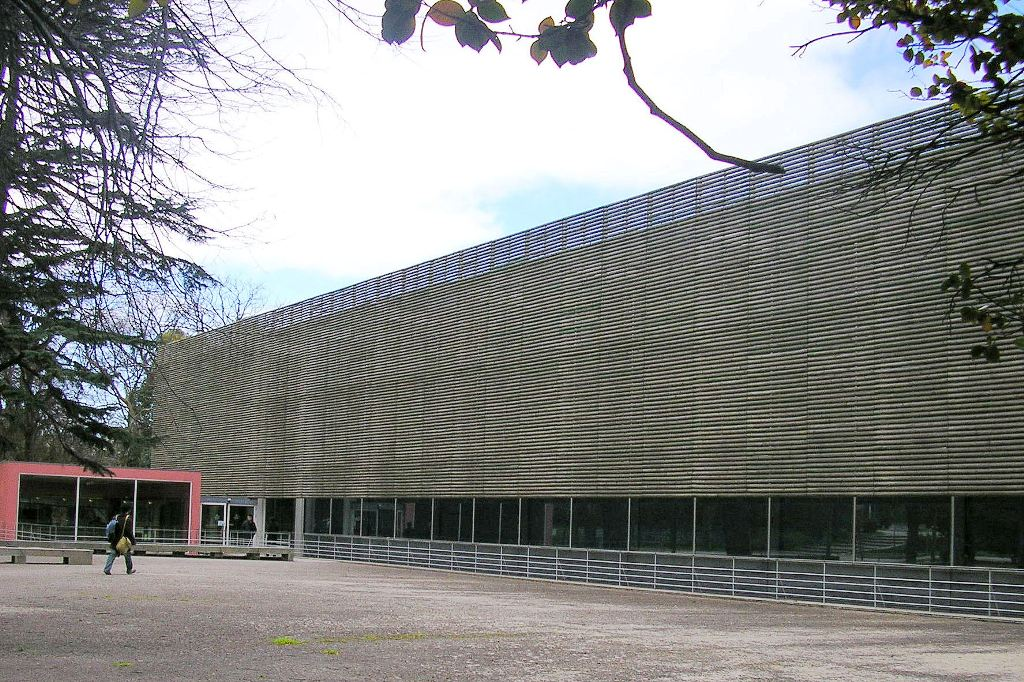
- 41°8′53″N 8°37′37″W
- Location: Lordelo do Ouro e Massarelos, Porto, Norte, Portugal

Other information
- Director: Instituto Gestão do Patrimonio Arquitectónico e Arqueológico
- Website: bmp.cm-porto.pt/bmag

Almeida Garrett Library (Portuguese: Biblioteca Almeida Garrett) is a library located in the civil parish of Lordelo do Ouro e Massarelos, in municipality of Porto, Portugal.

== History ==
Named after the writer Almeida Garrett (1799–1854), who was born in Porto, the library was inaugurated on 2 April 2001.

== Architecture ==
The Biblioteca Municipal Almeida Garrett is situated in the gardens of the Palácio de Cristal, a space for information and vocational leisure, along Rua Entrequintas. In order to serve the public, the library distributes its collections and equipment in diverse areas, providing support services. The library's reception area is the local with access to different parts of the building, including auditorium, stacks and gallery.

The Galeria do Palácio (Palace Gallery) is a versatile exposition space, occupying an area of 1,500 square metres (1,800 yd^{2}) over two floors. The area presents a program of regular expositions covering various themes, including arts, cultural heritage and science, in addition to presentation of documents, among others. It is also a focus for visiting expositions from local, national and international exhibitors receiving, on 4 February 2001, 20 groups as part of the European Capital of Culture.

The auditorium is an architectural space of important quality, with a connection to the garden alongside the library. It has the capacity to hold 192 people, with modern sound equipment, projection and lighting systems. With a large foyer and lateral mezzanine, the spaces realizes modern expositions and parallel activities. Its privileged location, near a green space in the heart of the city, and with several spaces, makes it a centre of important local activities, including: theatre, cinemas, conferences, book presentations, poetry sessions, musical spectacles, congresses and professional encounters.

== See also ==
- List of libraries in Portugal
