= List of libraries in Portugal =

This is a list of libraries in Portugal.

== Libraries by district/region ==
=== Aveiro ===
- Bblioteca do Seminário de Santa Joana Princesa
- Biblioteca Municipal de Aveiro

=== Azores ===
- Biblioteca Municipal Tomaz Borba Vieira, Lagoa, São Miguel Island
- Biblioteca Pública e Arquivo Regional de Ponta Delgada

=== Beja ===
- Biblioteca do Colégio de Nossa Senhora da Graça
- Biblioteca Municipal José Saramago, Beja

=== Braga ===
- Raul Brandão Municipal Library, Guimarães

=== Bragança ===
- Biblioteca Municipal de Bragança

=== Castelo Branco ===
- Biblioteca Municipal de Castelo Branco

=== Coimbra ===
- Biblioteca Joanina, Coimbra
- University of Coimbra
  - University of Coimbra General Library
  - Biblioteca das Ciências da Saúde, University of Coimbra

=== Évora ===
- Évora Public Library

=== Faro ===
- Biblioteca Municipal de Faro - António Ramos Rosa

=== Guarda ===
- Biblioteca Municipal Eduardo Lourenço, Guarda

=== Leiria ===
- Biblioteca Municipal Afonso Lopes Vieira, Leiria

=== Lisboa ===
- Academy of Sciences of Lisbon Library
- Ajuda National Palace Library, Lisbon
- Arquivo Histórico Ultramarino Library
- Biblioteca do Banco de Portugal, Lisbon
- Biblioteca Nacional de Portugal, Lisbon
- Calouste Gulbenkian Art Library, Lisbon
- Lisbon Newspaper Library
- National Republican Guard Library, Lisbon
- NOVA SBE Library, Carcavelos
- Oeiras Municipal Library
- Passos Manuel Library of the legislature, Lisbon
- Portuguese Army Library, Lisbon
- University Autónoma de Lisboa Library

=== Madeira ===
- Biblioteca Municipal do Funchal
- Madeira Arts Library
- Madeira Regional Archive and Library

=== Portalegre ===
- Biblioteca Municipal de Portalegre

=== Porto ===
- Almeida Garrett Library, Porto
- Diana Bar, Póvoa de Varzim
- Municipal Library of Porto
- Rocha Peixoto Municipal Library, Póvoa de Varzim

=== Santarém ===
- Biblioteca da Cúria Diocesana de Santarém
- Biblioteca Municipal Braamcamp Freire, Santarém

=== Setúbal ===
- Biblioteca Pública Municipal de Setúbal

=== Viana do Castelo ===
- Biblioteca Municipal de Viana do Castelo

=== Vila Real ===
- Montalegre Municipal Library

=== Viseu ===
- Biblioteca Municipal D. Miguel da Silva

== See also ==
- List of archives in Portugal
- Mass media in Portugal
- Open access in Portugal
- Portuguese literature

in Portuguese

- Directorate-General for Books, Archives and Libraries, Portugal (DGLAB) (in Portuguese)
- List of municipal libraries in Portugal (in Portuguese)
- Mobile Libraries of the Calouste Gulbenkian Foundation, 1958-2002 (in Portuguese)
- Portuguese Institute of Books and Libraries (in Portuguese)
- Portuguese Public Library Network (in Portuguese)
