= Passos Manuel Library =

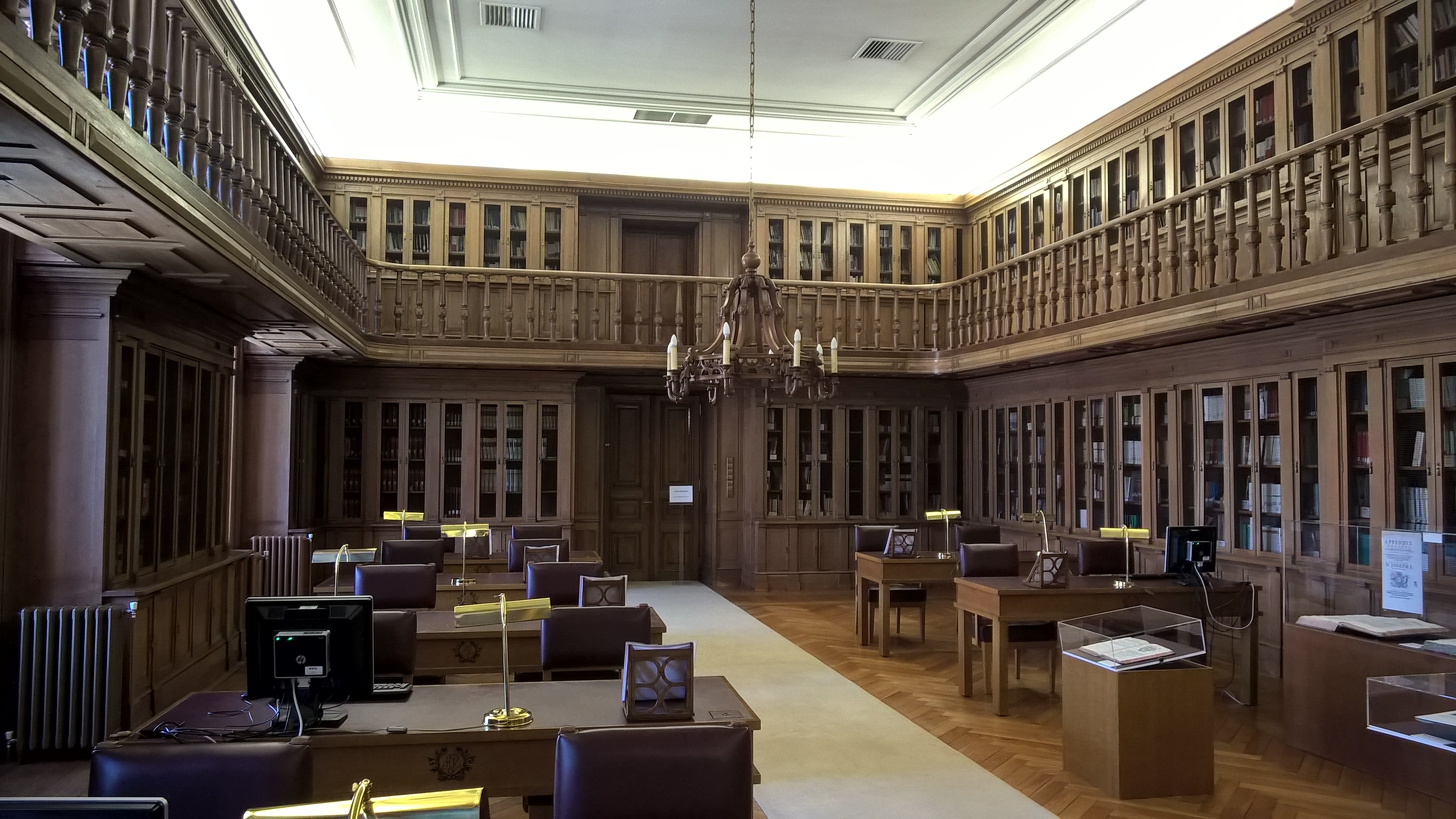
View of the library

The Passos Manuel Library (Portuguese: Biblioteca Passos Manuel) is the library of the Assembly of the Republic, the Portuguese national legislature. It houses a specialised collection of over 180 thousand volumes, mostly about parliamentary matters, Law, Political Science, History, Economics, and Statistics.

It was established by decree of Minister Passos Manuel in 1836. It was only in 1921 that it was definitely installed in its current location (in what used to be the dormitories of the ancient Monastery of Saint Benedict).

It was renamed after its founder following a small ceremony on 25 October 2017; this was the first of many public ceremonies held to commemorate the bicentennial of the Liberal Revolution of 1820.

== See also ==
- List of libraries in Portugal
