= Rocha Peixoto Municipal Library =

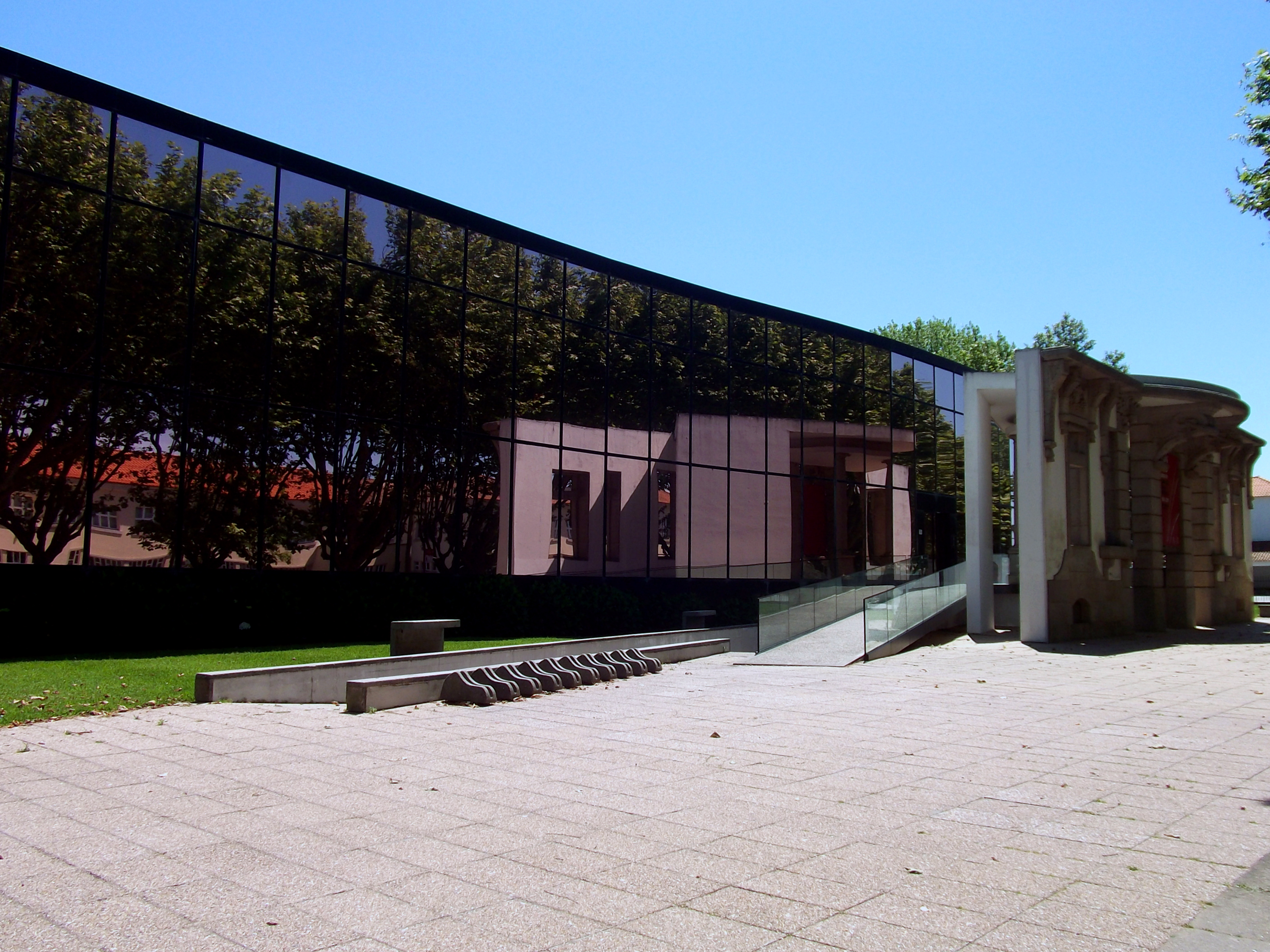
Rocha Peixoto Library in Rua Padre Afonso Soares.

The Rocha Peixoto Municipal Library (Portuguese: Biblioteca Municipal Rocha Peixoto) is a public library system serving the city of Póvoa de Varzim, Portugal. Its main library is located in Póvoa de Varzim school district, at Rua Padre Afonso Soares.

The first public library of Póvoa de Varzim officially opened in 1880, under the name Biblioteca Popular Camões, celebrating the three-hundredth anniversary of the death of Luís de Camões. Since then, it has moved several times. The main library has multiple sections such as children's library, multimedia, literature, scientific and Fundo Local, a section with studies about Póvoa de Varzim.

== Branches ==
The Rocha Peixoto Library has several branches. All of these branches were created in early 21st century with a new decentralization policy. It includes seven branches in civil parishes, two beach libraries, one garden library and seven school libraries.

- Aguçadoura Branch (2002)
- Amorim Branch (2007)
- Balasar Branch (2001)
- Beiriz Branch (2010)
- Estela Branch (2008)
- Laundos Branch (2003)
- São Pedro de Rates Branch (2000)
- Diana Bar Library (2002)
- Lagoa Beach Library (seasonal library)
- Garden Library (seasonal library)

== Architecture ==
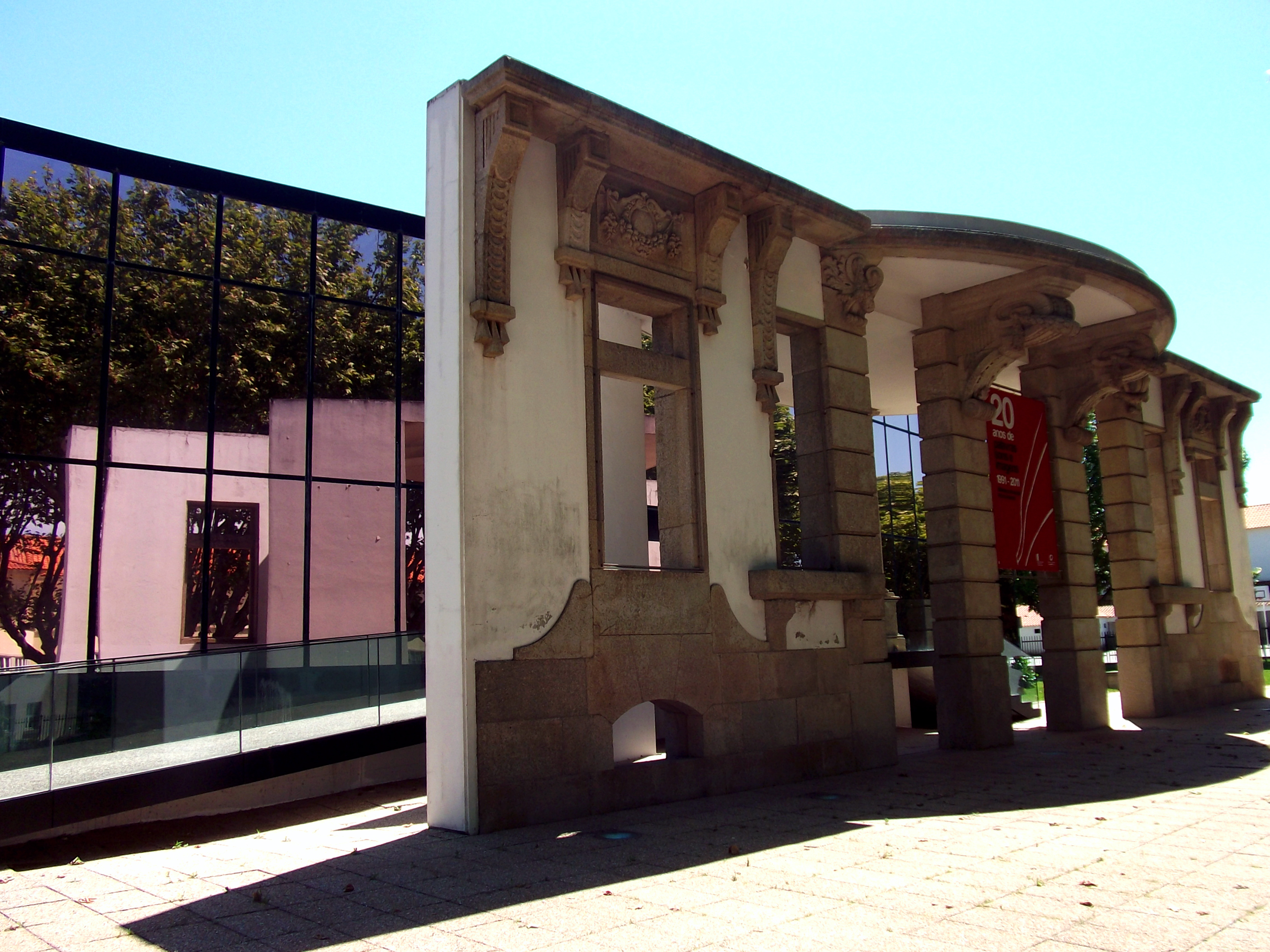
The 1921 Orfeon Povoense Façade

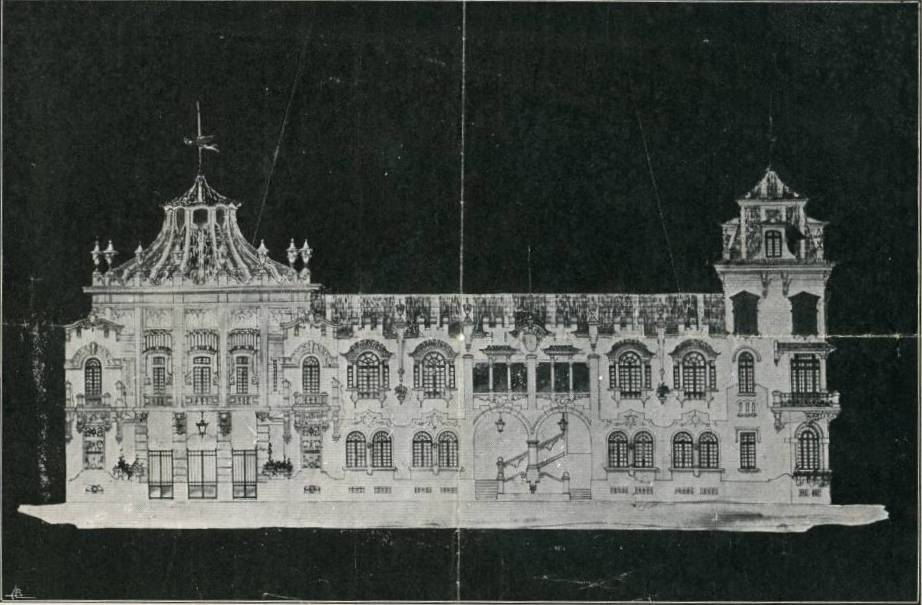
The constructed section was just the eastern base of the façade

The main library was built between 1985 and 1991 and is a contemporary architecture project by architect Silva Garcia. It won a national architecture prize in 1989. However, the main façade is an older construction from the project for the Orfeon Povoense Choral society headquarters. This façade was just part of a larger project by architect Francisco de Oliveira Ferreira, first shown during a public presentation in 1915 and the dream of Josué Trocado, that included the Motherly School (Escola Maternal), for the unfavored children of the municipality.

The project was too grand, especially for a leisure association, but Josué Trocado kept with the ambition and in November 20, 1921 works started in the façade, but it was noticeable then that the financial conditions were not met, and the façade remained unfinished. The unfinished façade, remained for a long time in the construction site, until it was transferred a couple of streets north to become the Old Façade of Rocha Peixoto Municipal Library.

== See also ==
- List of libraries in Portugal
