= Municipal Library of Porto =

Library in Porto, Portugal

Coordinates: 41.1461°N 8.6017°W

- Bibiloteca Municipal do Porto
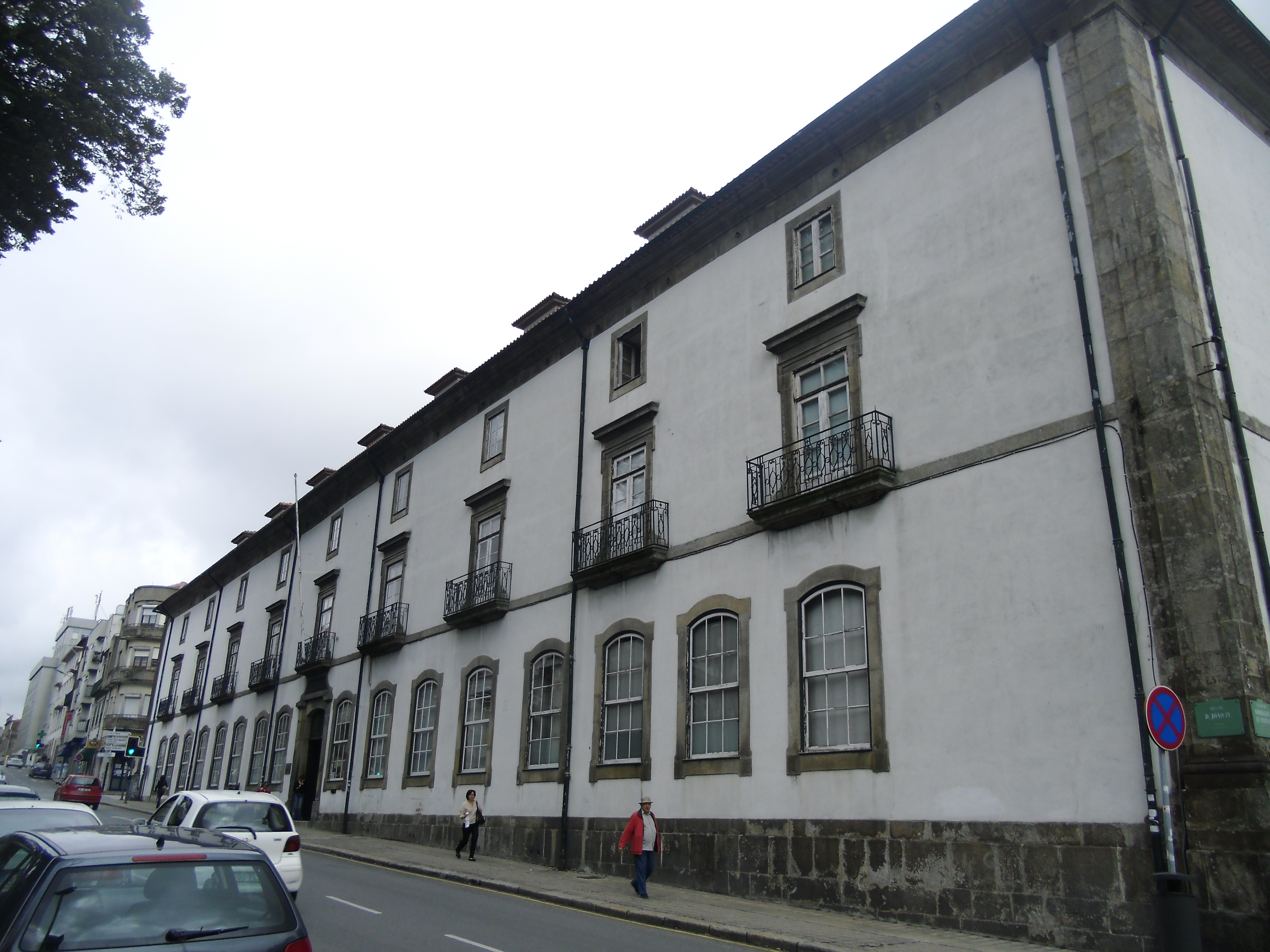
- The front facade of the former-Convent of Santo António da Cidade, current seat of the municipal library
- Location: Bonfim, Porto, Portugal
- Type: Public Library
- Established: 9 July 1833
- Reference to legal mandate: Royal Decree

Other information
- Website: bmp.cm-porto.pt

The Municipal Library of Porto (Portuguese: Biblioteca Pública Municipal do Porto) is a library located in the civil parish of Bonfim, municipality of Porto in the Portuguese district of the same name.

== History ==
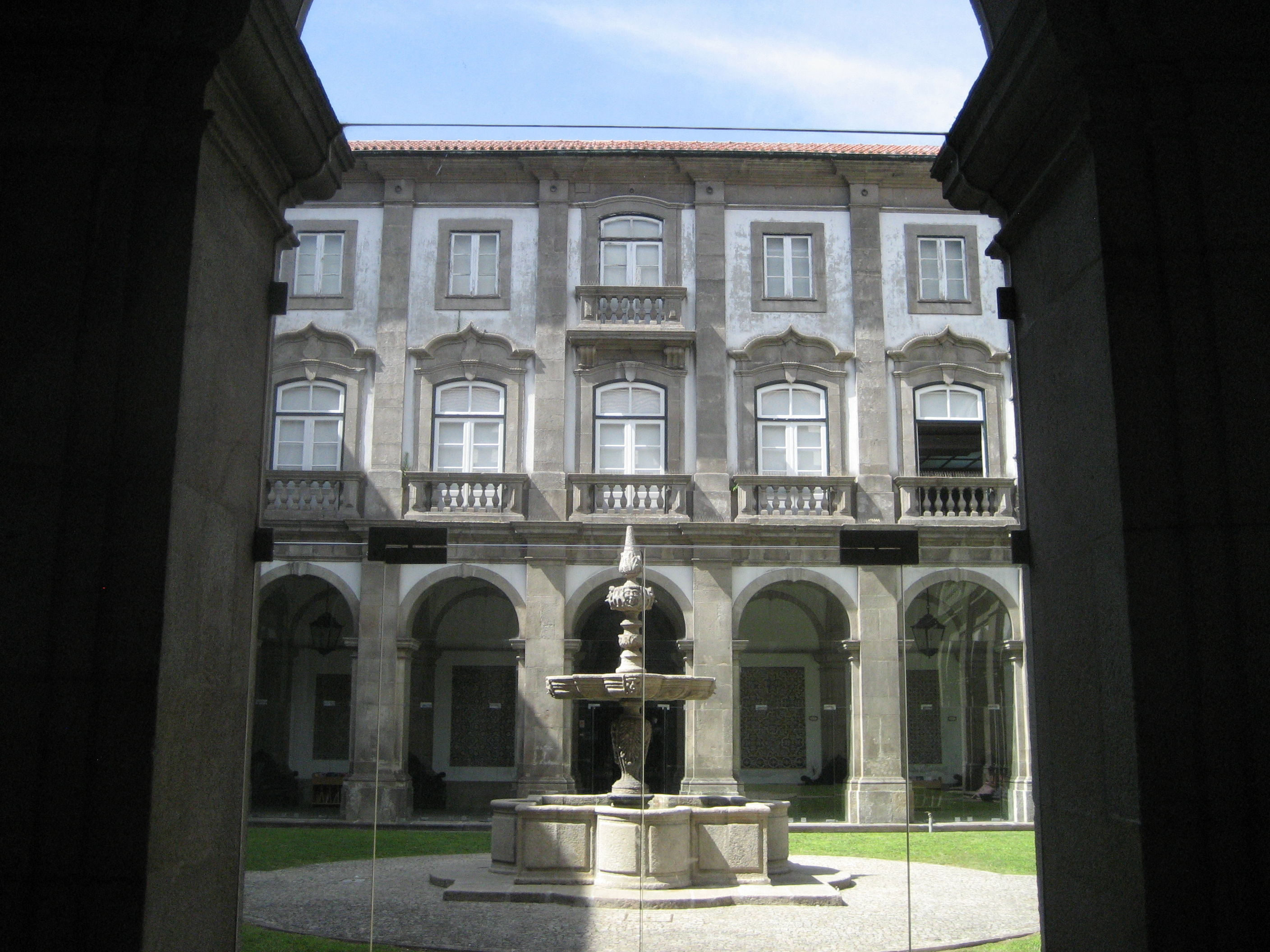
The former-cloister of the Convent of Santo António

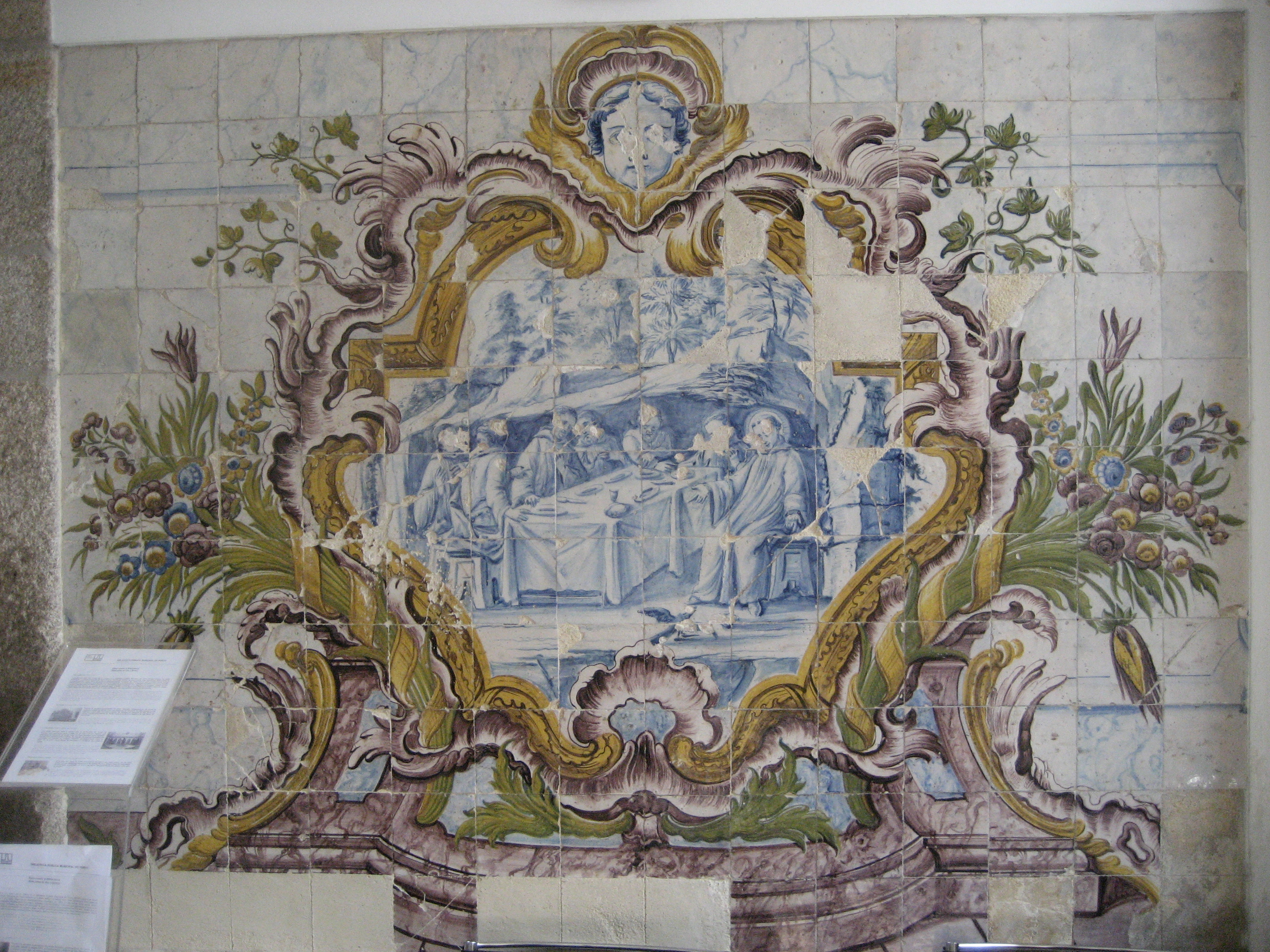
Part of the Hispano-Moorish azulejos that were ceded from the former-Convent of Santa Clara in 193

The Real Biblioteca do Porto (Royal Library of Porto) was established on 9 July 1833, by decree of the King D. Pedro and endorsed by Cândido José Xavier (Minister/Secretary of State for Affairs of the Kingdom).

The library was initially installed in 1841 in the Hospício de Santo António do Vale da Piedade, in the Praça do Cordoaria and later the Episcopal Palace of Porto. In 1842 it finally moved to the Convent of Santo António da Cidade hospice, next to the Garden of São Lázaro, along Rua D. João IV.

The first librarian was appointed by the Minister Inspector, with the first books being collected from the former libraries of the convents and religious institutions of the Diocese. The first books in the library were 16 manuscript volumes which had been heavily used for the time. They were supplemented by collections from various wealthy private book collectors. According to Alexandre Herculano, the library initially consisted of 36,000 volumes and 300 manuscript codices.

By 1842, the library consisted of 24,256 works (47,322 volumes) and some 4200 volumes from the former convents in Vila do Conde and others. At that time, the first printed catalogs from the library began appearing at the time. In 1877, the collection of rare manuscripts was enriched by the legacy of the Count of Azevedo.

This institution was transformed into a municipal library by decree on 27 January 1876, promulgated by King D. Luís I (signed by António Rodrigues Sampaio and former-municipal president Francisco Pinto Bessa).

Between 1929 and 1932, Hispano-Moorish azulejos from the Convent of Santa Clara, in Vila do Conde were moved to the public library.

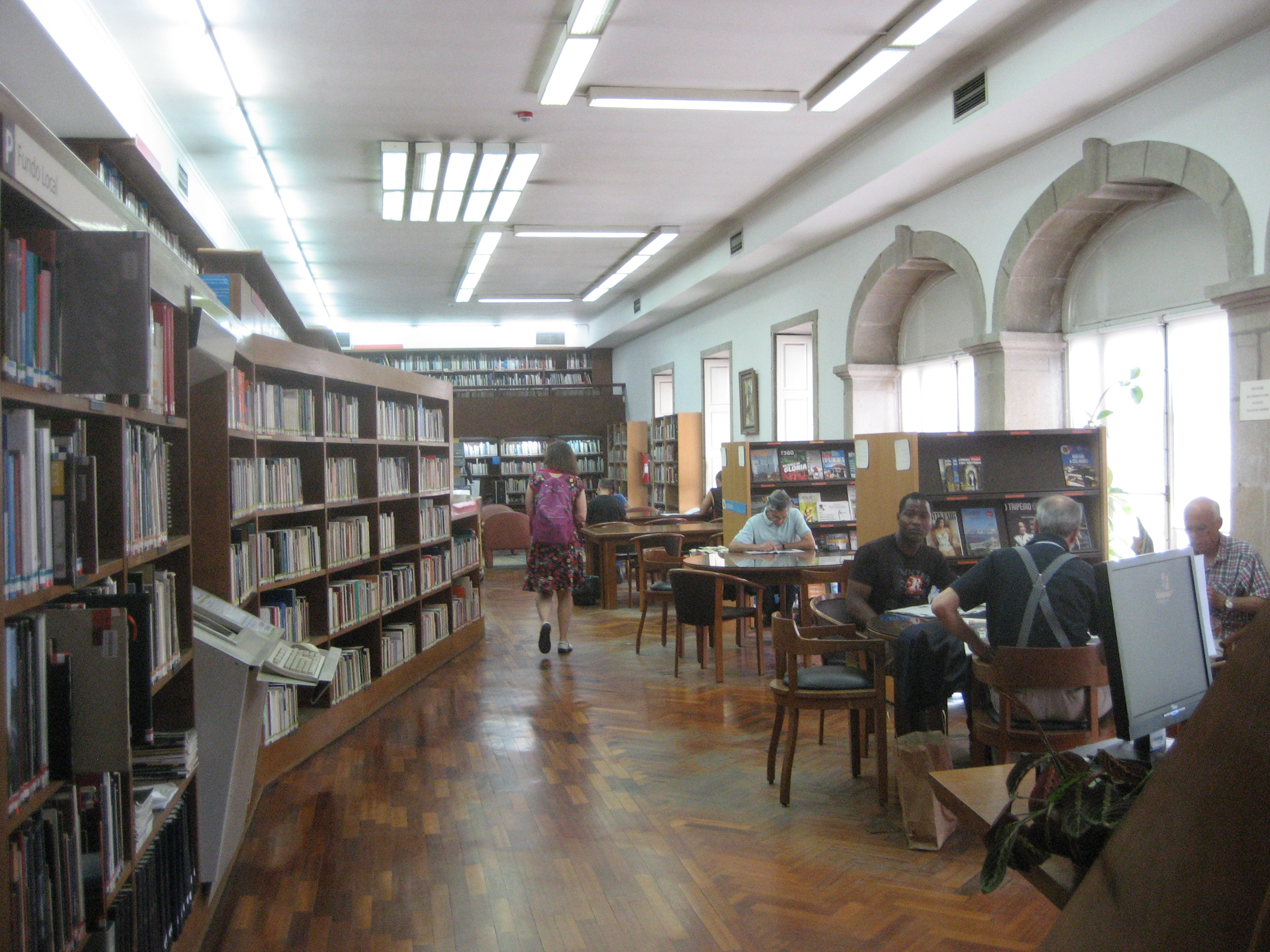
The interior of the municipal library

== See also ==
- List of libraries in Portugal
