= Convent of Santo António da Cidade =

- Convento de Santo António da Cidade
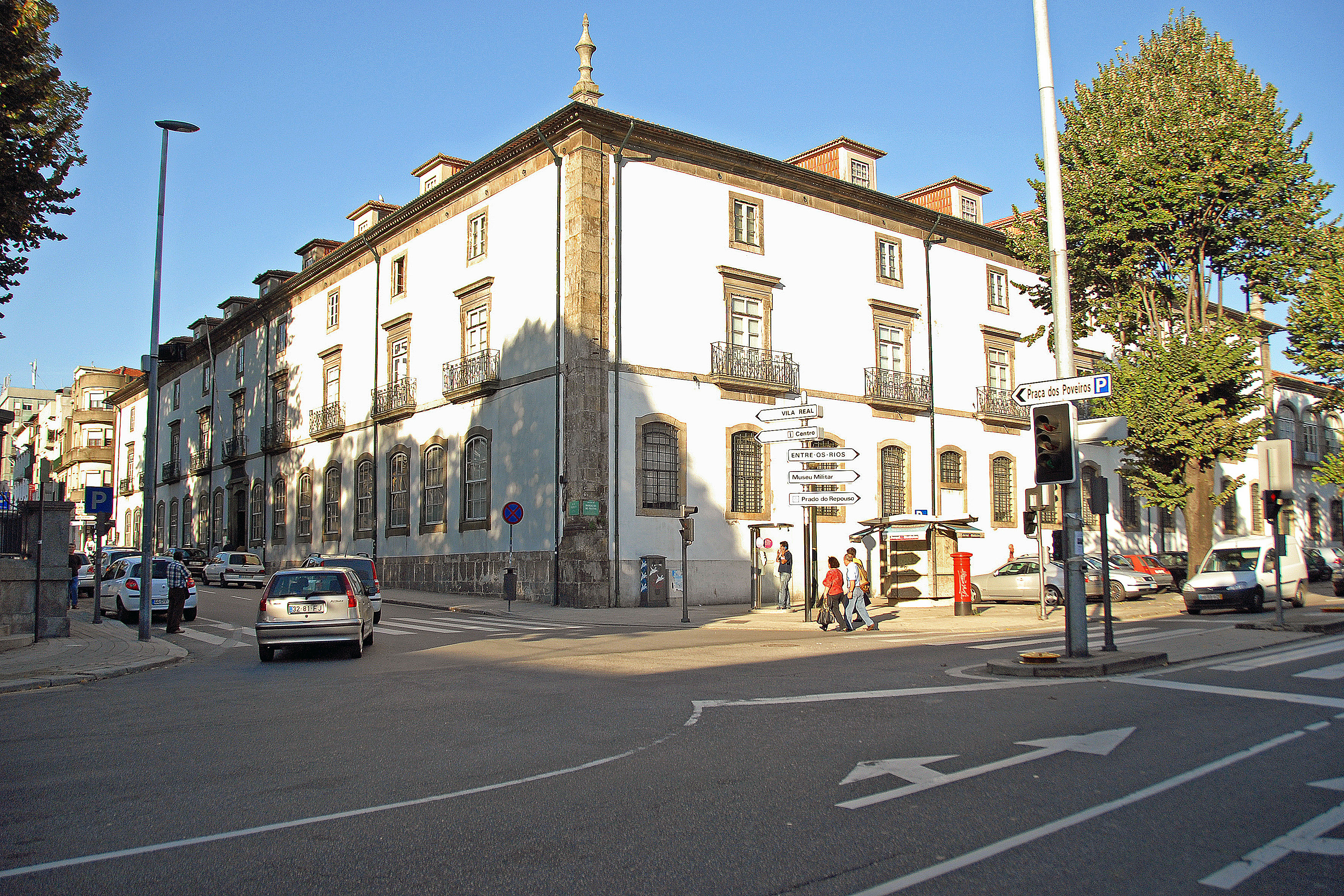
- The modern facades of the old Convent of Santo António
- Interactive map of the Convent of Santo António da Cidade area

General information
- Type: College
- Location: Bonfim, Porto, Portugal
- Coordinates: 41°8′45.8″N 8°36′6.3″W
- Opened: 1747
- Owner: Portuguese Republic

Technical details
- Material: Granite

The Convent of Santo António da Cidade (Portuguese: Convento de Santo António da Cidade) is a former-convent and public library in the civil parish of Bonfim, in the municipality of Porto, in the Portuguese district of the same name.

== History ==
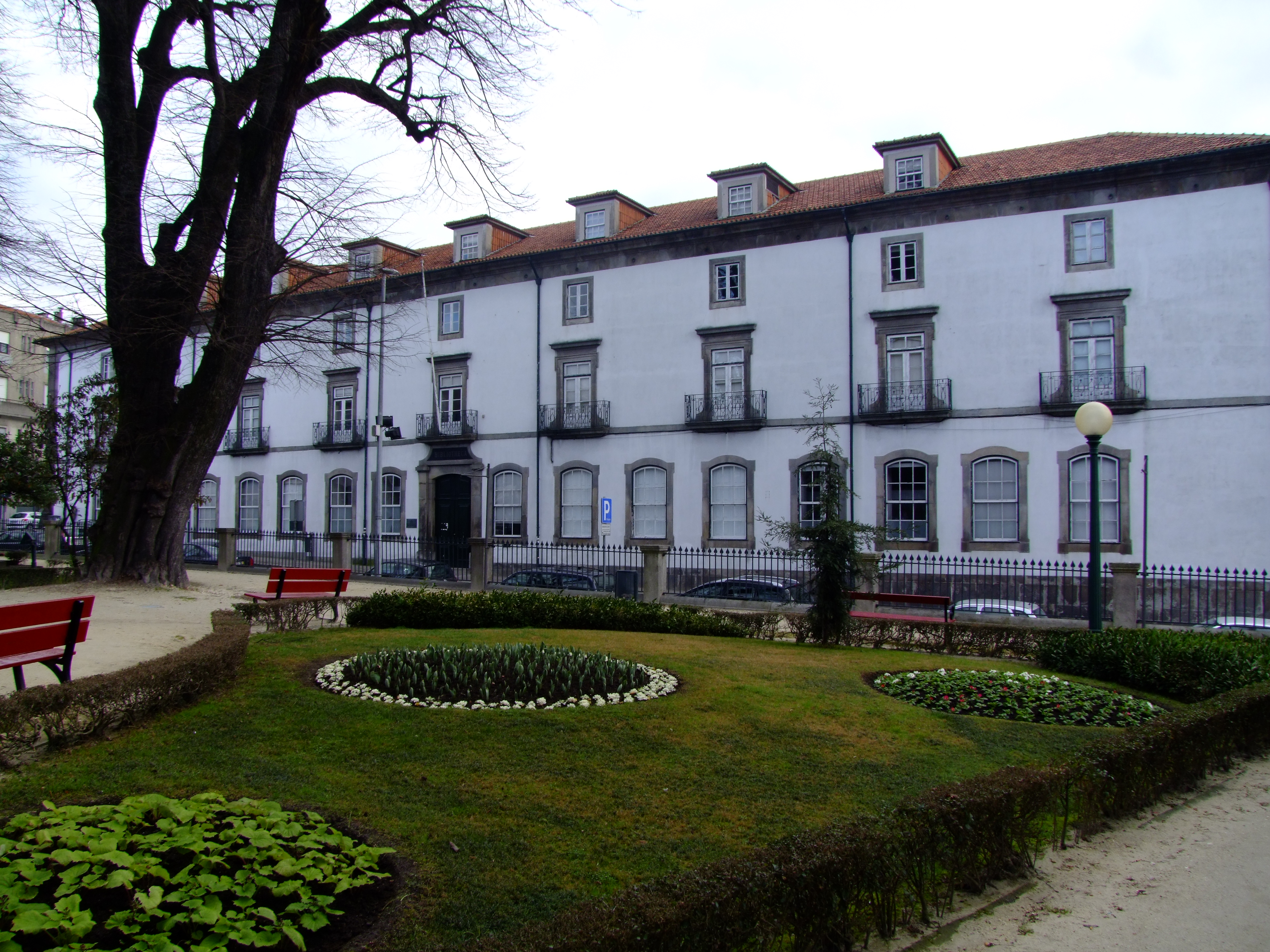
The facade of the Convent of Santo António oriented to the Garden of São Lázaro

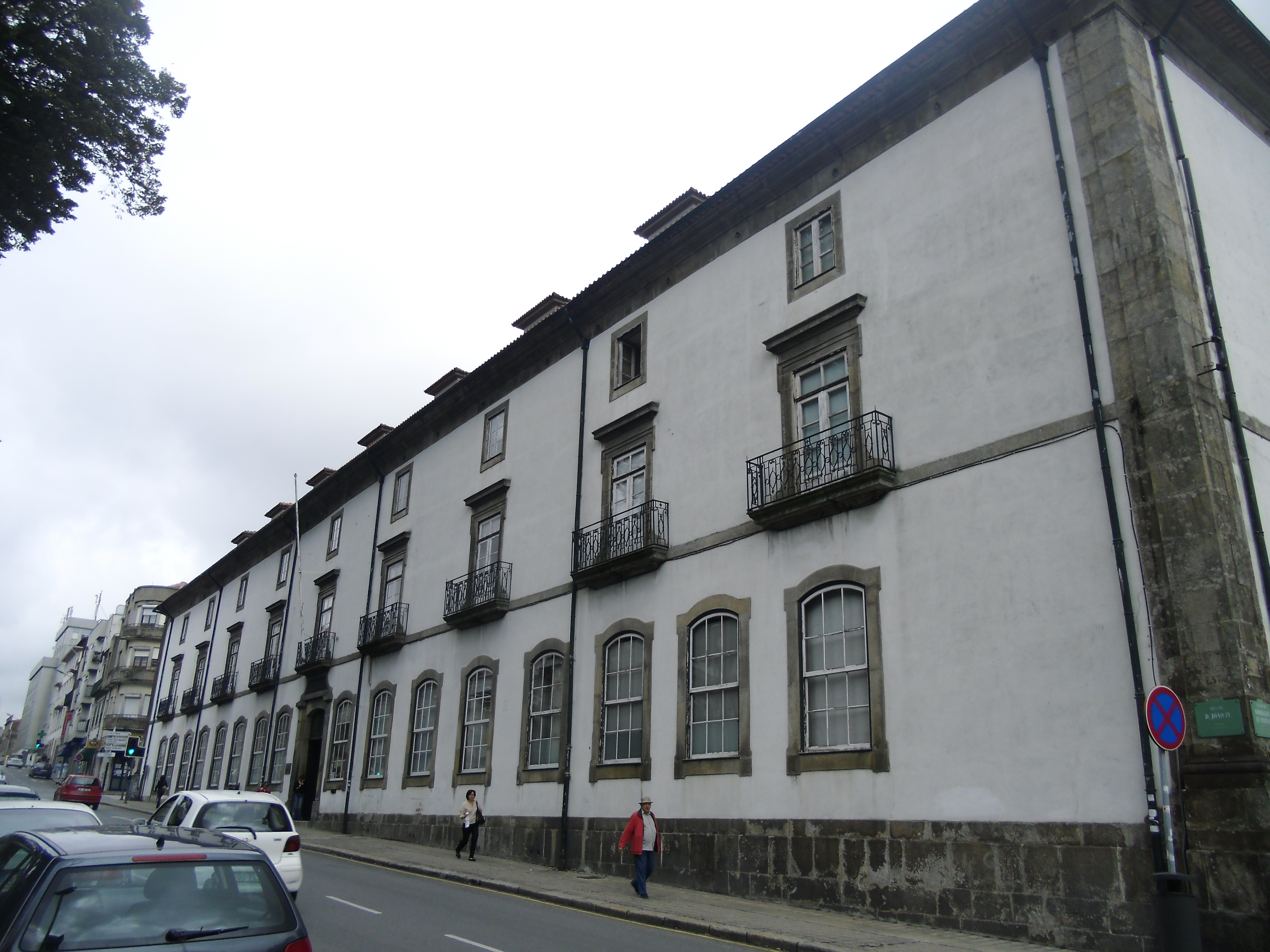
Exterior facade of the convent/public library

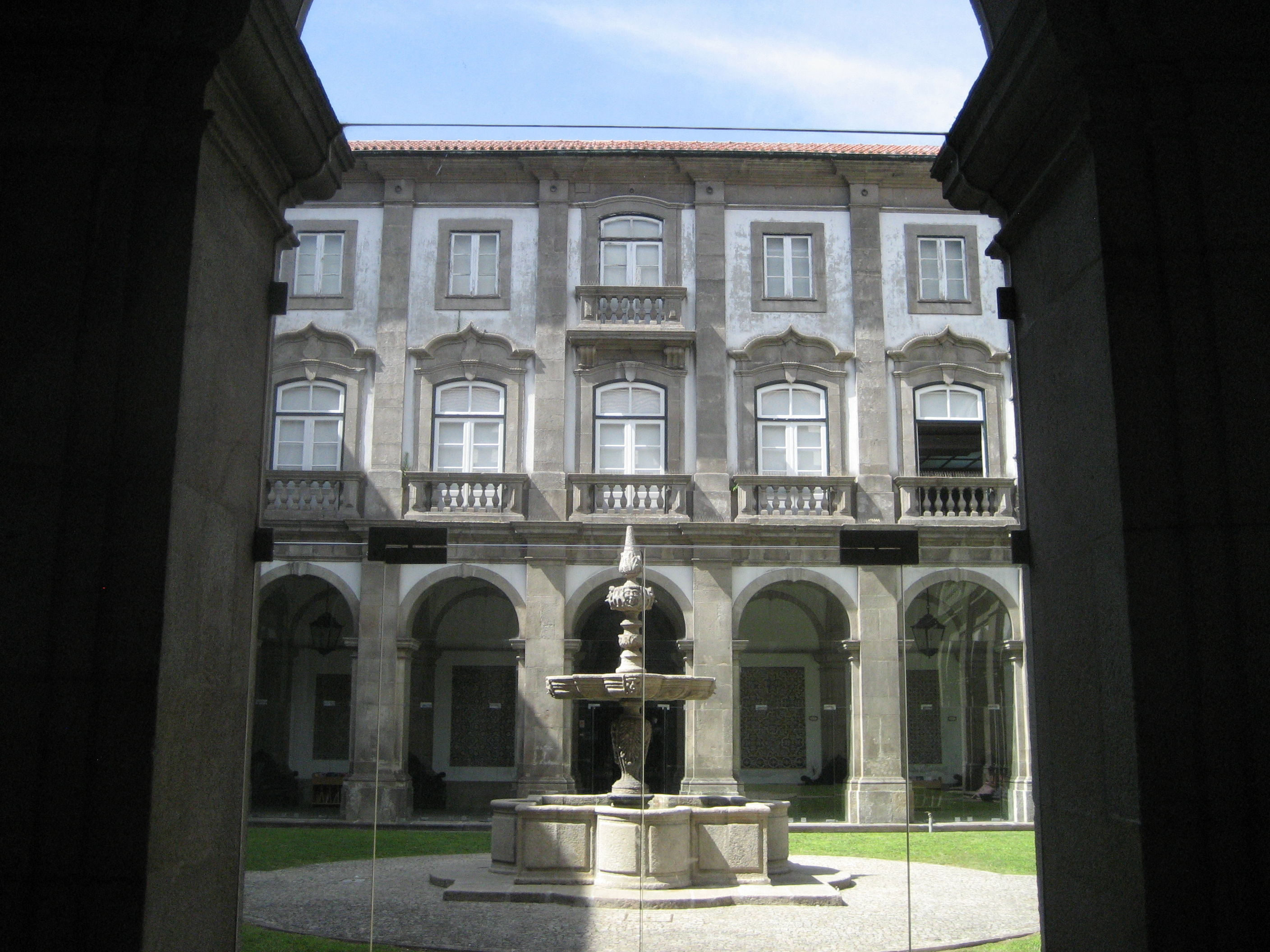
Entrance to the cloister of the convent

In 1747, a hospice was founded in the city of Porto to the invocation of Nossa Senhora da Conceição (Our Lady of the Conception), by the Minor Reformed Friars of St. Francis, or Capuchos of the Province of Conceiçaõ.

Two years later, a chapel was constructed by Dionísio Verney in the field of São Lázaro, that was later acquired by the religious friars for the hospice. Between 1779 and 1780, Queen D. Maria I conceded to the Franciscans authorization to found a Regular Hospice in the city of Porto. On 26 November 1780, António José Mendes Guimarães sold the "public chapel with mystical houses with it" and other lands and houses in the field of São Lázaro, to the Franciscans. The community of Franciscans of the Province of Conceição transferred from the houses of Rua de Santa Catarina to the building in São Lázaro on 30 November 1780. On 26 May 1781. there was a petition by the municipal council to occupy the land of São Lázaro to continue the services of a religious hospice.

In 1783, the convent of Santo António was founded in São Lázaro, by the religious minor reformed friars of St. Francis. The convent building was not yet concluded (although the fountain in the cloister dates to this period) when in 1789 Father Agostinho Rebelo da Costa indicated the building was would be the largest convent in the city. In two years time the hospice became a convent and capital house.

In April 1809, the convent began to operate as a hospital for French troops during the Peninsular War and then on 20 May designated for Portuguese troops.

In July 1831, the convent was abandoned by the last religious friar and occupied by English troops supporting the Liberal monarchy.

On 9 July 1833, the Real Biblioteca do Porto (Royal Library of Porto) was established by decree of D. Pedro, which was initially lodged in the Hospício de Santo António do Vale da Piedade, Cordoaria and the Episcopal Palace of Porto.

In 1834, the religious orders were extinguished, even as the convent had not been concluded. Temporarily, the Museu Nacional dos Reis (National Museum of the Kings) stored their collections in the dependencies of the former-convent, with access coming from the cloister.

The creation of the Escola de Belas Artes do Porto (Porto School of Fine Arts), by Passos Manuel, resulted in the use of the convent's terrace for their activities, and the institutions move in 1836.

Provisionally, in September 1836, the Royal Library was open in the Episcopal Palace.

The former-convent of Santo António was donated to the Municipal Council of Porto on 30 July 1839, resulting in the move of the Royal Library. On 4 April 1842, the Royal Library was definitively installed in the former hospital.

Between 1929 and 1932, Hispano-Moorish azulejos from the Convent of Santa Clara, in Vila do Conde were moved to the public library.

In addition to the diverse basis for the library's collection (manuscripts, special editions, etc.) the public library became a depository for many azulejo tiles from religious convents, which were collected in the entrance to the cloister. Among the panels saved were those from the second half of 18th century, from the Convent of São Bartolomeu of Coimbra, another two from the refectory from the monastery of São Bento da Vitória, the Convent of Santa Clara and the Monastery of São Bento de Avé-Maria.

== Architecture ==
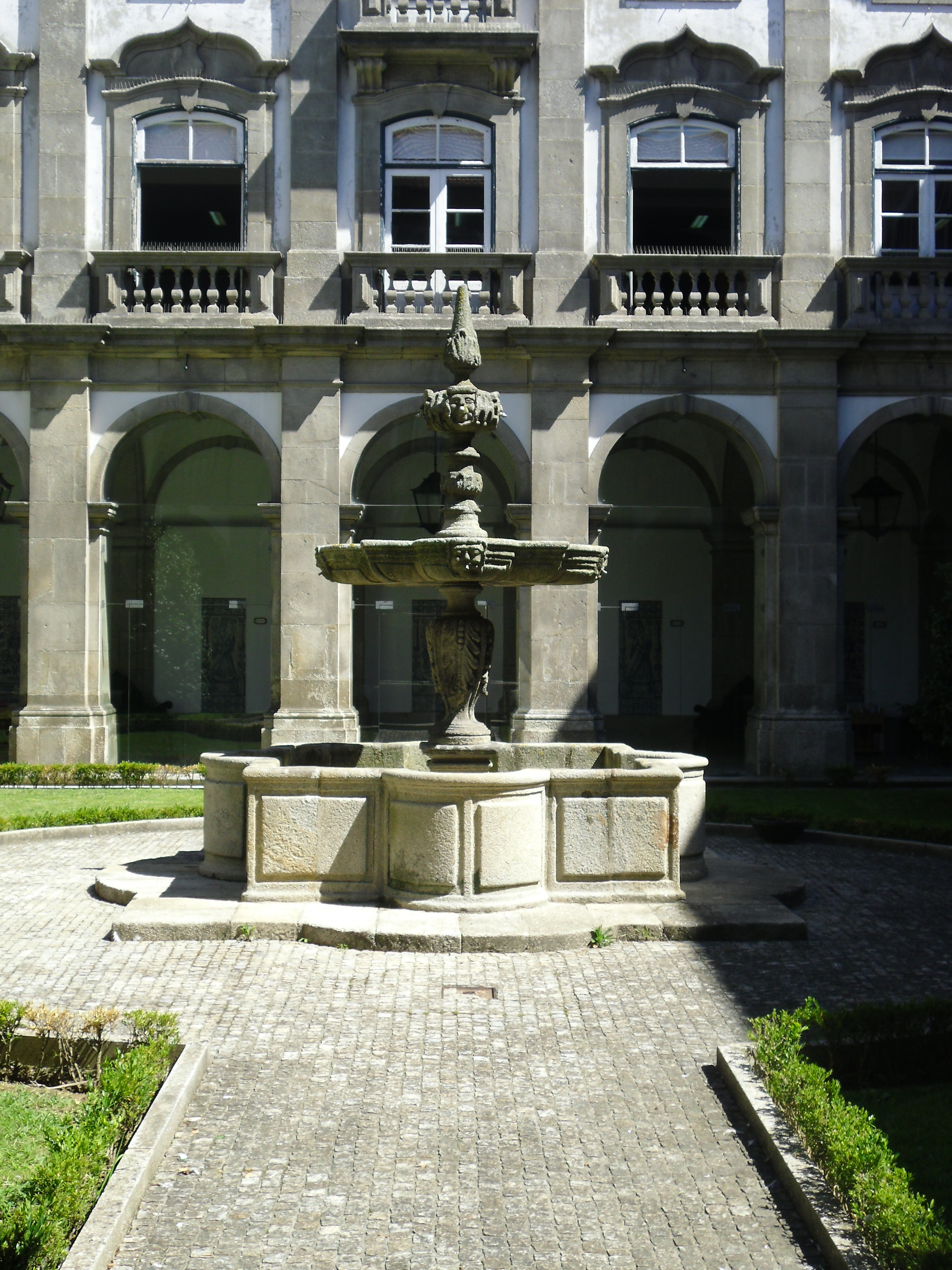
A view of the fountain constructed in 1783

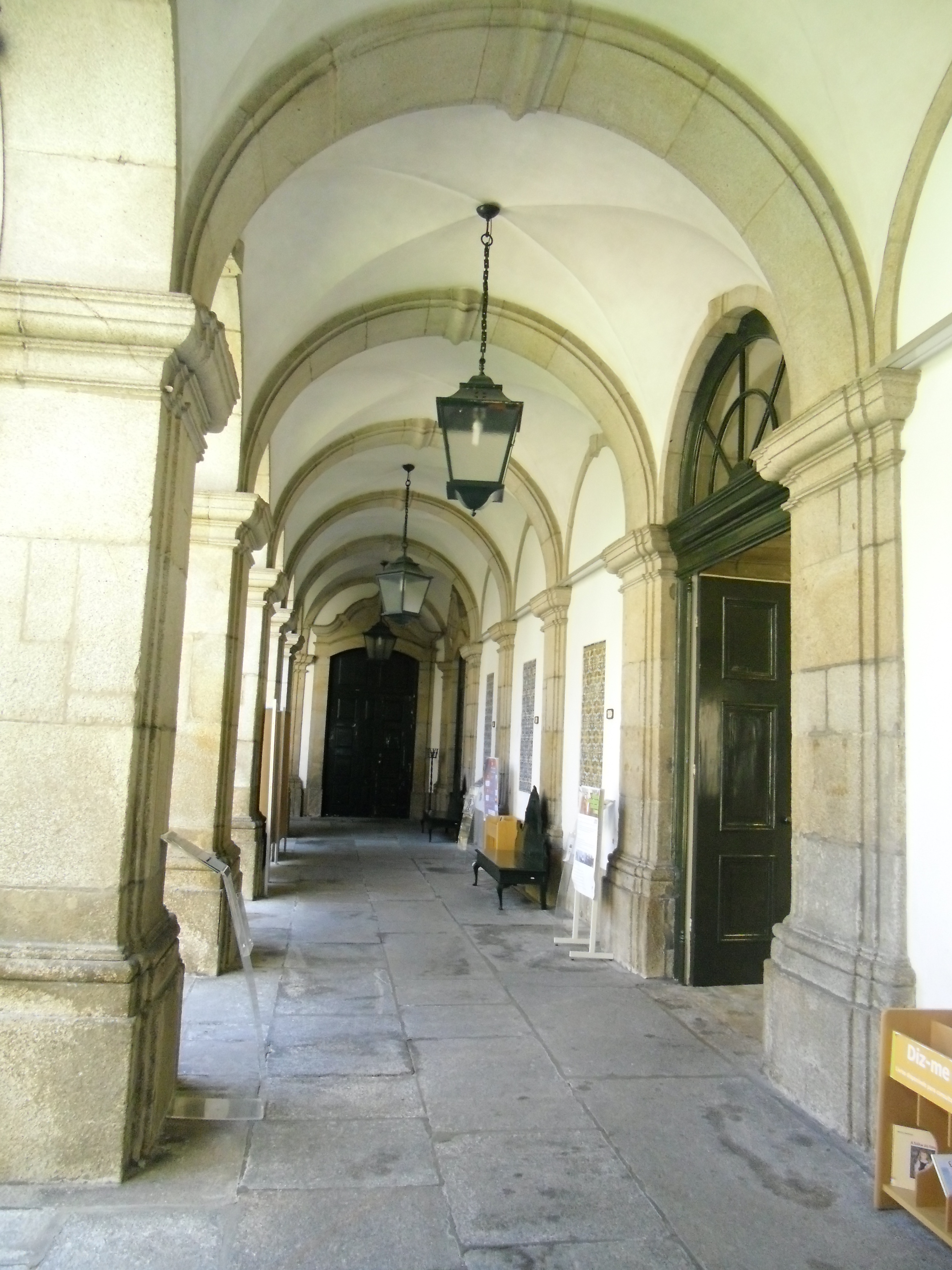
The arches of the cloister

The building is located in an urban area, inserted in an area of 18th century buildings in front of the public garden of São Lázaro. The remnants of the Franciscan convent are conserved in the dependencies and cloister that connect various bodies of the structure, even as the convent's church was demolished.

The convent dependencies and cloister function as elements to connect various bodies, volumes covered in tiled roofs. The facades are plastered and painted white, with cornerstones in granite. The principal facade, oriented to the west, include two-storeys separated by granite friese, mezzanine and tile, that encircles by staggered granite base and topped by cornice, overlaid with frieze and protruding eaves. The first register includes 17 guilhotine-style windows with arched lintel, framed in granite centered by principal door with granite arch. The second floor has 8 rectangular windows, dual-door and flag, that includes framing surmounted by frieze and cornice, protected by ironwork. Over the windows are smaller two-leaf windows, framed with granite. Along the mansard roof are 7 windows, covered in tile. The lateral left facade is divided into three pains with the left decorated with friezes and triangular frontispiece, crowned by plinth and marked with square frame. The central section has two windows, followed by two windows similar to the principal facade. In the lateral right section there are two windows on the ground, three windows on the second register and three simple, windows on the third.

The rectangular cloister includes three-storeys, with the ground floor led by granite arches, interconnect with granite rectangular pillars.

The interior includes various halls, some interconnected, across corridors for circulation, connected by granite staircases.
