= Domenico Duprà =

Italian painter

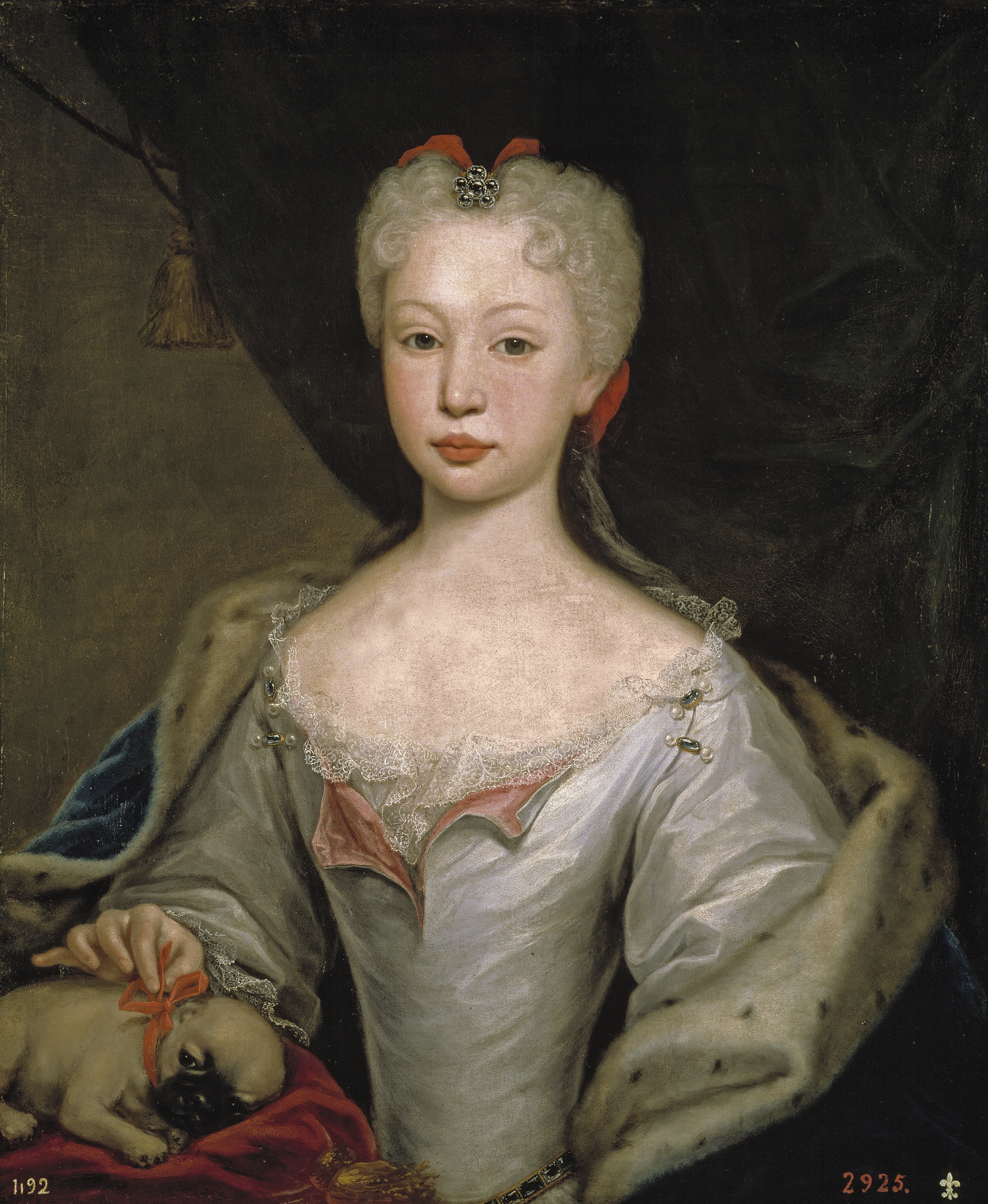
D. Barbara of Portugal, by Domenico Dupra

Giorgio Domenico Duprà (1689–1770) was an Italian rococo artist who served as a court painter to the House of Braganza, in Lisbon, and the House of Savoy, in Turin.

== Life ==
Born at Turin and educated in Rome, Domenico Duprà was a disciple of Francesco Trevisani. He was also strongly influenced by the French school of portrait. From 1719 he began working at the Lisbon court of King John V, the Magnanimous of Portugal, where he remained notably as court painter until 1730.

Back in Rome he was employed by the exiled Jacobite court of the Stuarts at the Palazzo Muti.

In 1750 he returned to Turin and with his brother Giuseppe Duprà (1703-1784) worked for the royal House of Savoy. He died at Turin in 1770. The Prado Museum preserves three of his works depicting females members of royalty quickly recognizable for its delicate and blushing tonalities recalling pastels.

== Gallery ==
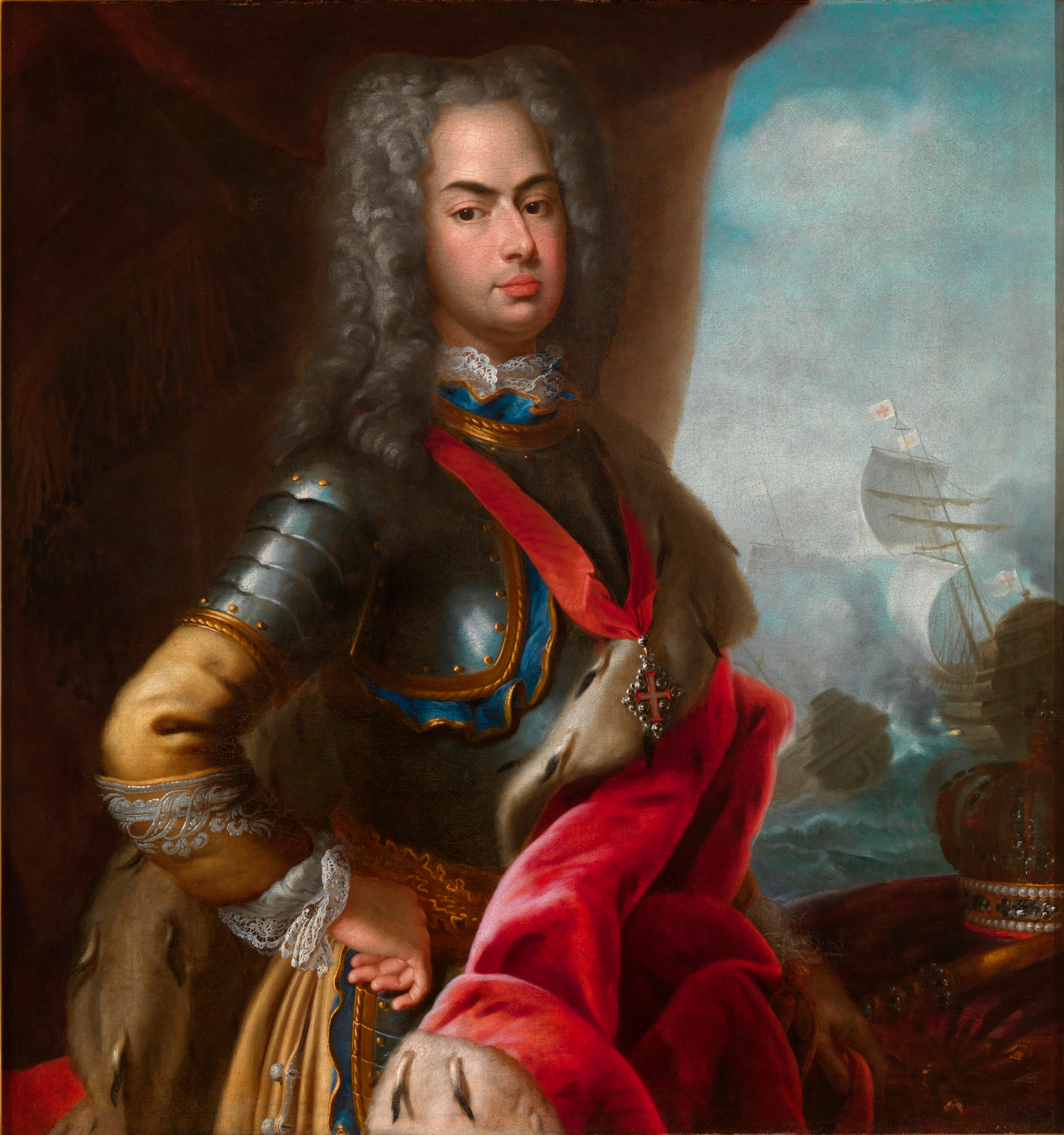
King John V of Portugal at the Battle of Matapan; 1719

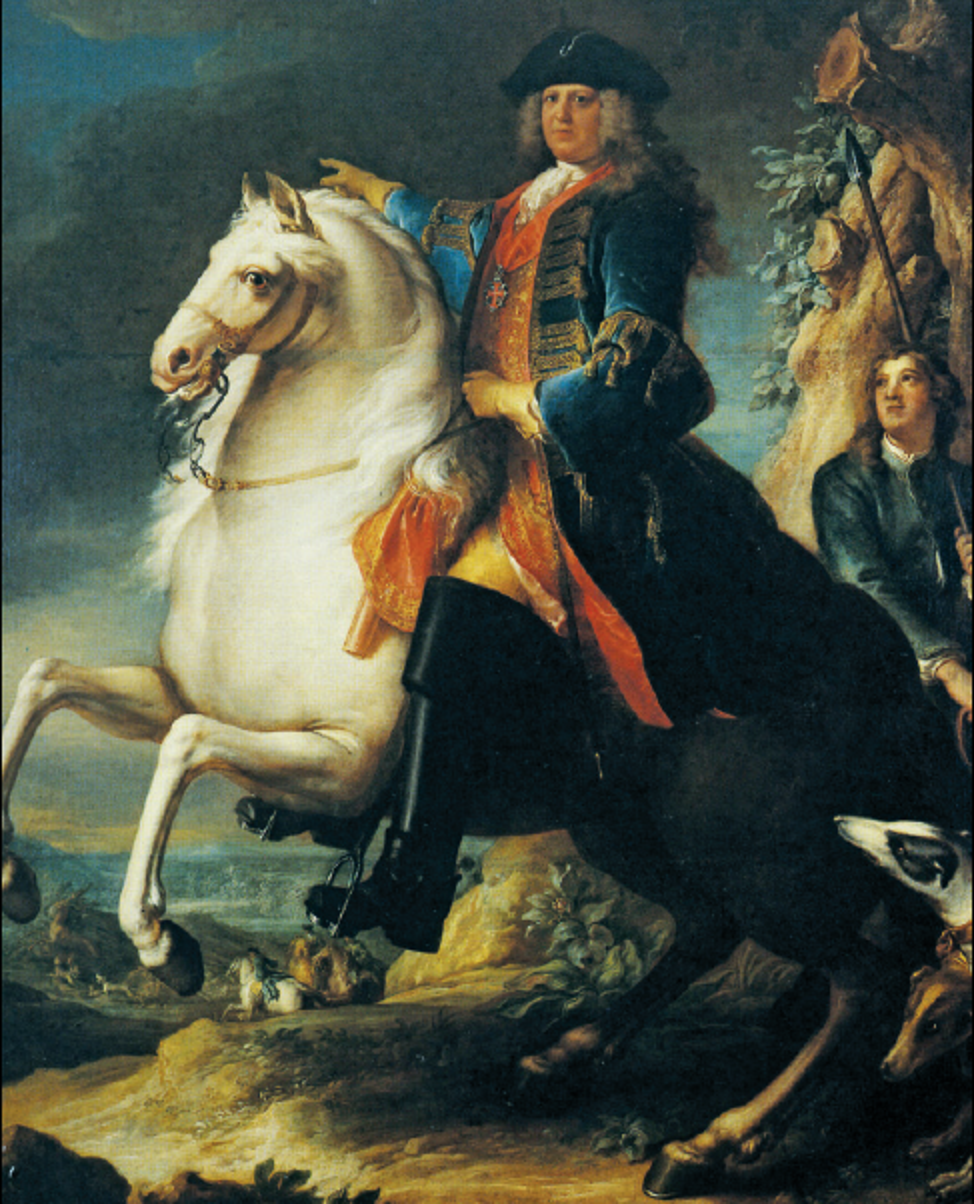
Jaime Álvares Pereira de Melo, 3rd Duke of Cadaval; 1728-30

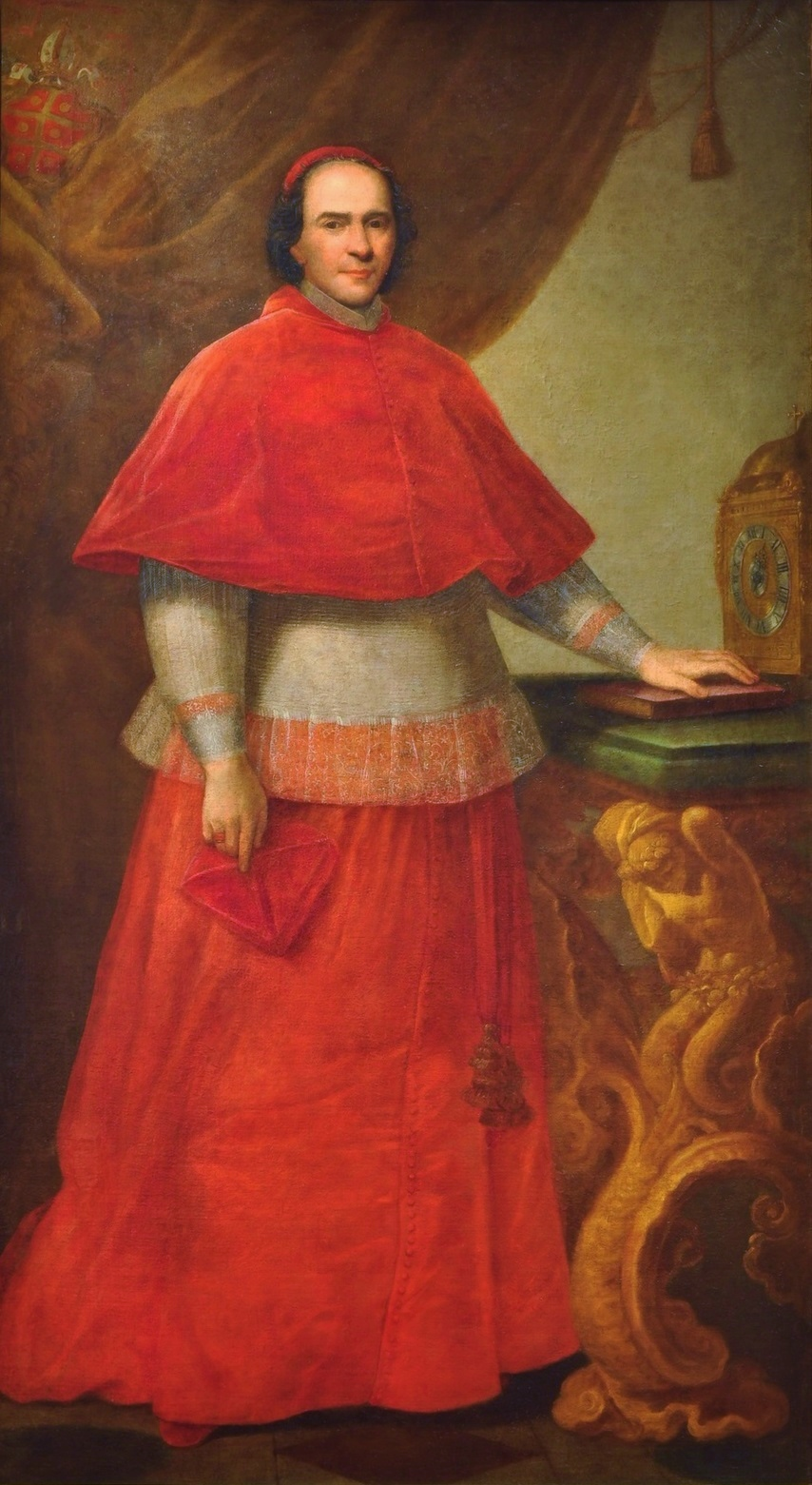
Patriarch Tomás de Almeida; c. 1725

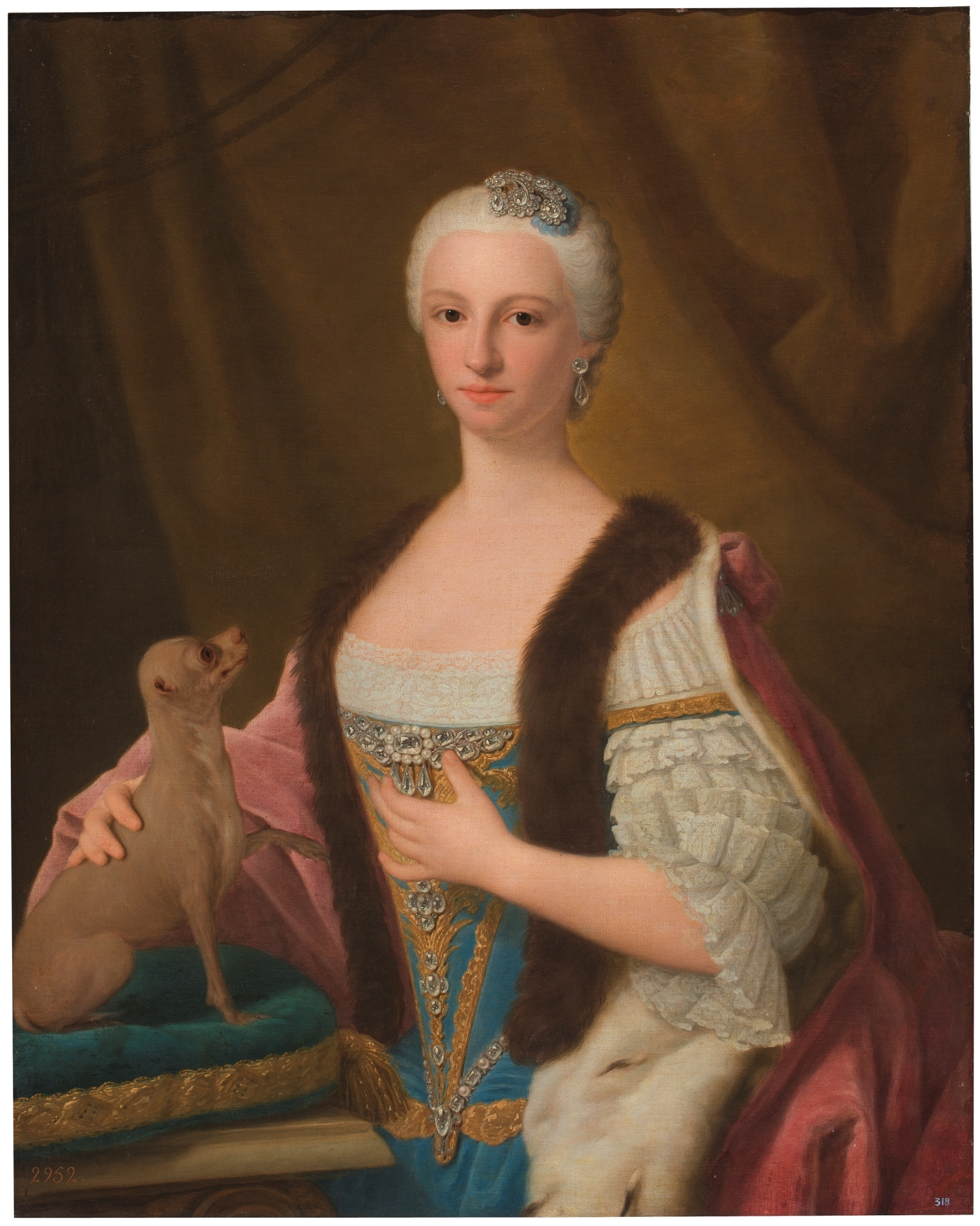
Maria Antonia of Spain, Queen of Sardinia; c. 1750

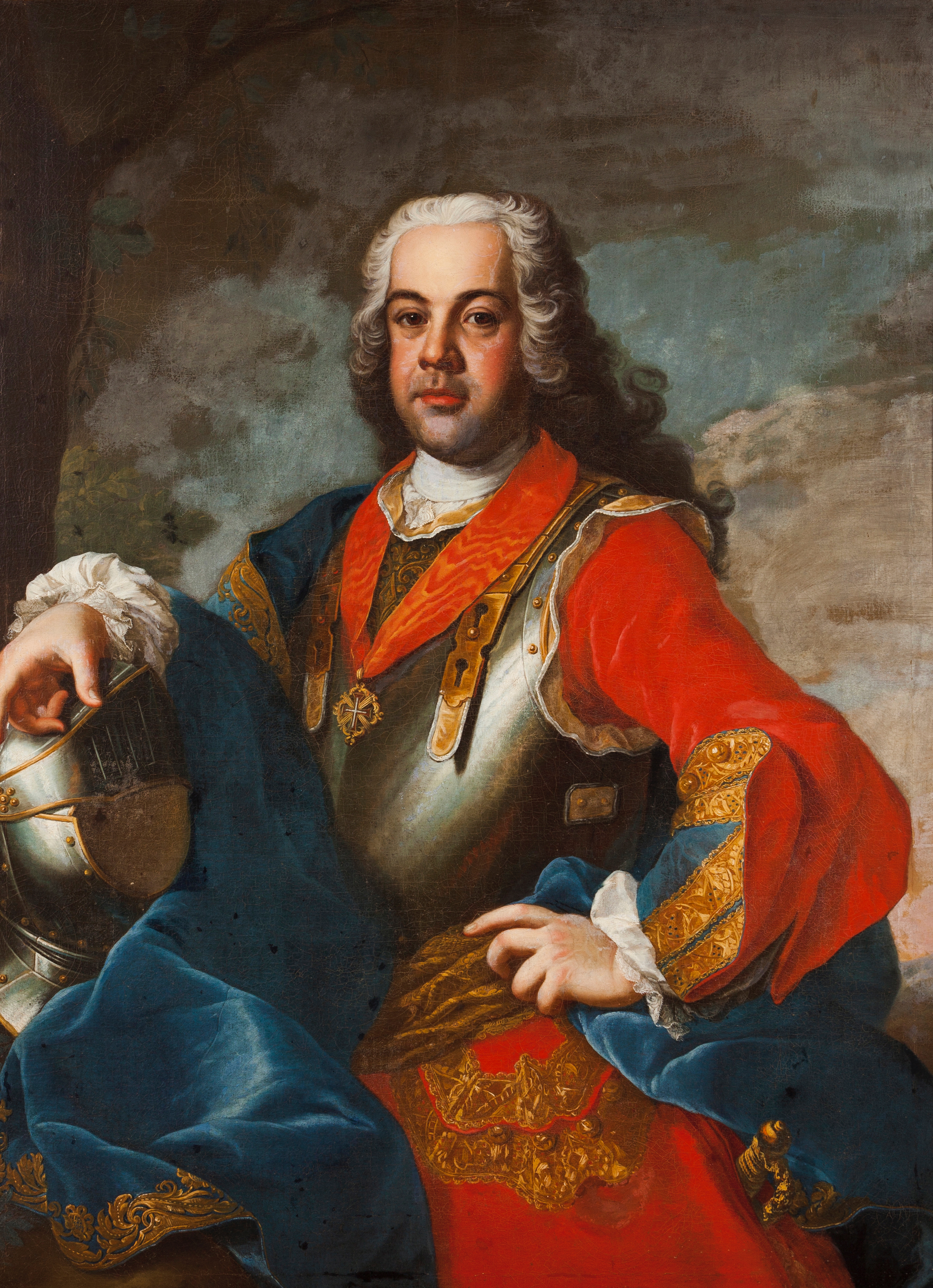
Infante Francisco, Duke of Beja; 1729-30

== Bibliography ==
- Aldo de Rinaldis, " L'Arte in Roma ", Bologna 1948
- Nicola Spinosa, "La pittura in Italia. Il Settecento", vol. Il, Milan, 1990
