= Kendall Cup =

Cricket cup in Portugal

The Kendall Cup is the trophy awarded to the winners of a 2-day cricket match between representative teams from Lisbon and Porto, in Portugal, played alternately in the two cities. While this match had been played since 1861 on an almost annual basis, the Cup itself was originally presented in 1920 by Mr. A.C. Kendall in memory of Lt. Rawes who died in World War I, a keen cricketer who lived and played in Portugal. Since 1920 the fixture has taken place every year, except for 5 years during World War II, the present holders (2015) being Porto. In 2011 the Cup match celebrated 150 years since the first match took place, with a 10 wicket win for Lisbon. After an enforced two year break for COVID-19 the (delayed) Centenary of the trophy was played in Porto in 2022, ending in a draw, leaving Porto with the Cup as holders.

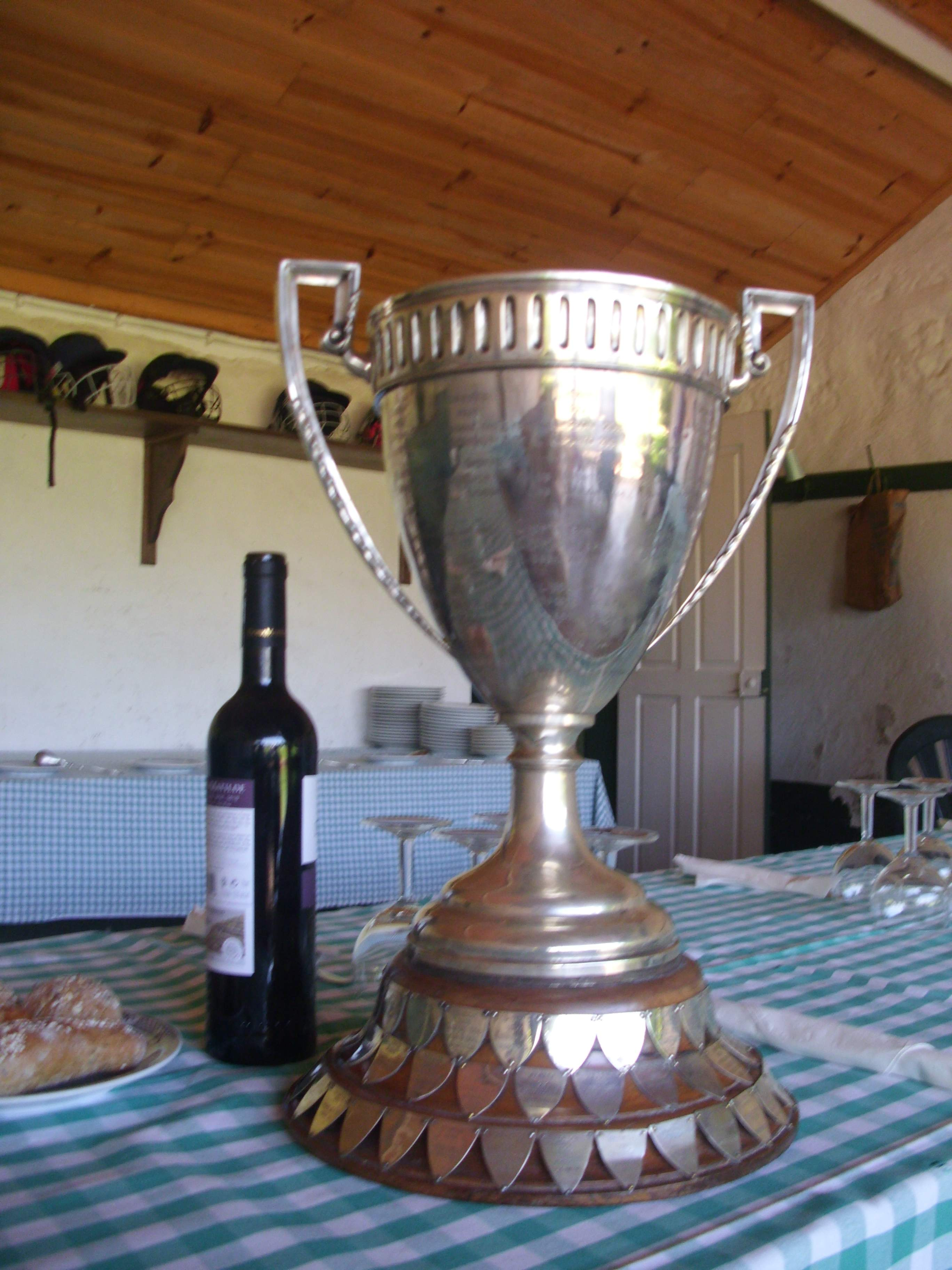
The Kendall Cup

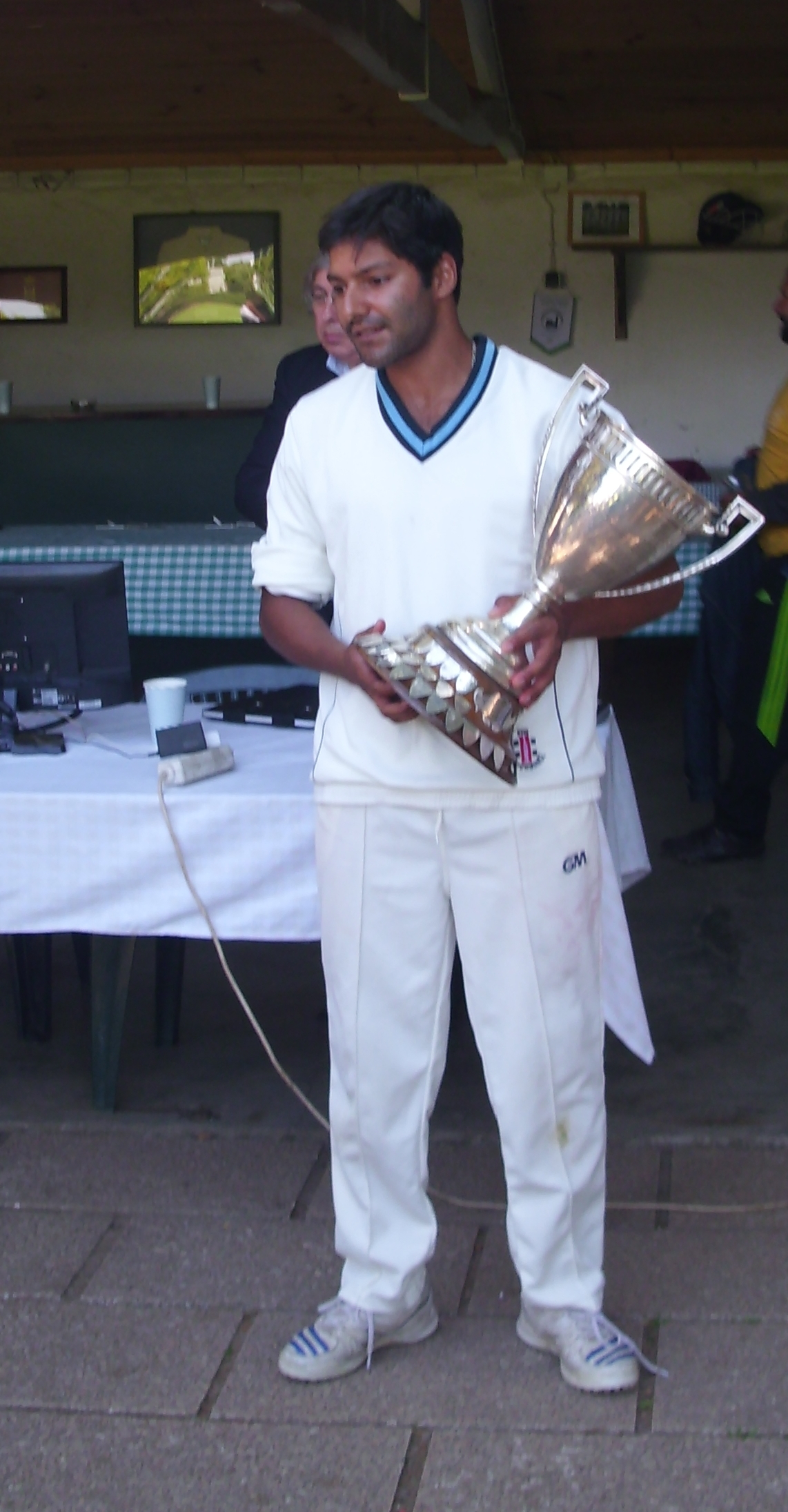
The Porto captain and the Kendall Cup 2015
