= Queluz =

Queluz may refer to:

== Portugal ==
- Queluz, Portugal, a city in the municipality of Sintra, Portugal
  - Queluz (Sintra), one of the civil parishes in the city of Queluz
  - The Queluz National Palace, located in the city

== Brazil ==
- Queluz, São Paulo, a municipality in the state of São Paulo, Brazil
- Conselheiro Lafaiete, a municipality in the state of Minas Gerais, Brazil, previously known as Queluz
