= Convention of Cintra =

1808 agreement allowing French troops to evacuate from Portugal

The Palace of Queluz, where the Convention of Cintra was signed.

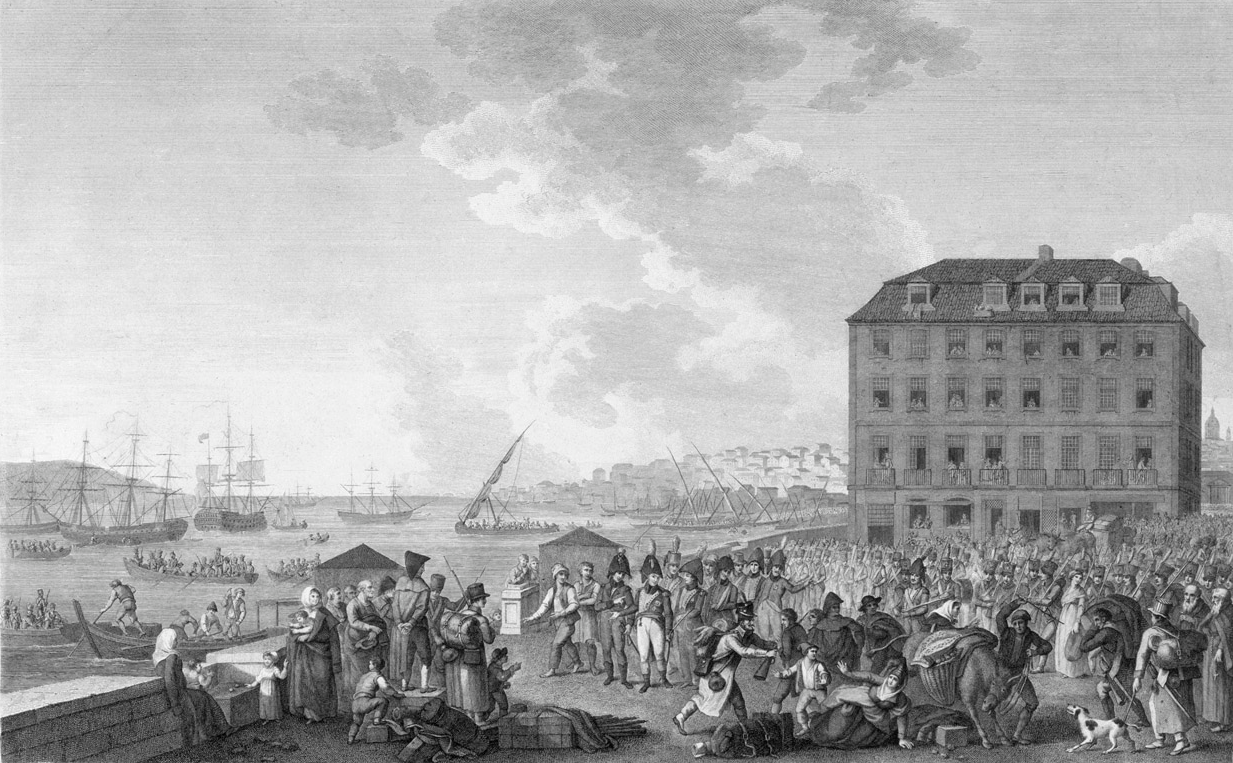
Jean-Andoche Junot embarks for France after the Convention of Cintra at Cais do Sodré, Lisbon.

The Convention of Cintra (or Sintra) was an agreement signed on 30 August 1808, during the Peninsular War. By the agreement, the defeated French were allowed to evacuate their troops from Portugal without further conflict. The convention was signed at the Palace of Queluz, in Queluz, Cintra, Estremadura.

== Background ==
The French forces, under Jean-Andoche Junot, were defeated at Vimeiro by the Anglo-Portuguese forces, commanded by Sir Arthur Wellesley on 21 August and found themselves almost cut off from retreat. However, at that moment, Wellesley was superseded by the arrival of Sir Harry Burrard and then the next day by Sir Hew Dalrymple. Both were cautious men and had seen little recent fighting; rather than push the French, they were satisfied to open negotiations. Wellesley had sought to take control of the Torres Vedras area's high ground and cut the French retreat with his unused reserve, but he was ordered to hold. Talks between Dalrymple and François Kellerman led to the signing of the convention.

== Terms ==
Dalrymple allowed terms for the French similar to those a garrison might receive for surrendering a fortress: 20,900 French troops were evacuated from Portugal to Rochefort with all their equipment and personal property by the Royal Navy. Junot arrived there on 11 October. Avoiding all Spanish entanglements and getting free transport meant that the French would travel loaded, instead of lightly like a defeated garrison marching to its own lines.

== Aftermath ==
The convention was seen as a disgrace by many in the United Kingdom, who felt that a complete defeat of Junot had been transformed into a French escape, and Dalrymple had also ignored the Royal Navy's concern about a blockaded Russian squadron in Lisbon. The squadron was allowed to sail to Portsmouth and eventually to return to Russia although Britain and Russia were at war.

Wellesley wanted to fight, but he signed the preliminary armistice under orders. Dalrymple's reports were written to centre any criticism on Wellesley, who still held a ministerial post in the government. Wellesley was subsequently recalled from Portugal, together with Burrard and Dalrymple, to face an official inquiry. The inquiry was held in the Great Hall at the Royal Hospital Chelsea from 14 November to 27 December 1808. Wellesley defended himself by saying that there was no reason to oppose Junot's terms of surrender, as they were technically lawful. All three men were cleared, but while Wellesley soon returned to active duty in Portugal, Burrard and Dalrymple were quietly pushed into retirement and never saw active service again. Sir John Moore, commenting on the inquiry, expressed the popular sentiment: "Sir Hew Dalrymple was confused and incapable beyond any man I ever saw head an army. The whole of his conduct then and since has proved him to be a very foolish man".

== Legacy ==
Lord Byron lamented the convention in his Childe Harold's Pilgrimage:

And ever since that martial synod met,
Britannia sickens, Cintra! at thy name;
And folks in office at the mention fret,
And fain would blush, if blush they could, for shame.
How will posterity the deed proclaim!
Will not our own and fellow-nations sneer,
To view these champions cheated of their fame,
By foes in fight o'erthrown, yet victors here,
Where Scorn her finger points, through many a coming year?
--Canto I, XXVI

The future British Poet Laureate William Wordsworth wrote a pamphlet, The Convention of Cintra, in 1808. He also wrote a passionate sonnet, "Composed while the author was engaged in writing a tract", that laments the bondage felt by "suffering Spain" although the Convention concerned only Portugal. The poem was included in his Sonnets Dedicated to Liberty. Delays in publication meant that journalistic and satirical features of Wordsworth's prose have been overlooked.

== See also ==
- Timeline of the Peninsular War

== Sources ==
- Glover, Michael (1970). Britannia Sickens. Leo Cooper, London. ISBN 0-85052-047-9.
