= Manuel Caetano de Sousa =

Portuguese architect

Library of the Palace of Mafra designed by Manuel Caetano de Sousa

Manuel Caetano de Sousa (1738–1802) was a Portuguese architect. He studied architecture under his father Tomás Caetano. He worked in the late Baroque and rococo style of architecture. On the death of Mateus Vicente de Oliveira he became architect to the royal family and was appointed architect in charge of public works and raised to the rank of an artillery colonel.

His works included the church of the "Incarnation, of S. Domingos" and the Bemposta Chapel. In his capacity as Royal architect he worked on various of the many royal palaces, most notably being responsible for the great library at Palace of Mafra and the east wing of the Palace of Queluz, which is today that part of the palace reserved for a visiting head of state. He also designed the tower of the Royal Chapel. In 1795, to honour of the birth of Dom António, 4th Prince of Beira, de Sousa designed an amphitheatre for use as a bull ring constructed in the Praça do Comércio in Lisbon.
