= Intellcorp =

International intelligence and security group

Intellcorp Group
- Formerly: IntellCorp
- Company type: Private
- Industry: Intelligence, Defense and Security
- Founded: 2016
- Founders: David G. Santos, Ruben Ribeiro
- Headquarters: Queluz, Lisbon, Portugal
- Areas served: Africa, Asia, Europe, North America, South America
- Key people: Ruben Ribeiro (founder and CEO)
- Number of employees: 70+ (2021)
- Website: www.grupointellcorp.com

Intellcorp Group is a Lisbon-based international intelligence and security group that works in Portuguese-speaking markets, but has clients in many other territories.

== History ==
Intellcorp was founded in 2016. In 2017, the two founders, David G. Santos and Ruben Ribeiro decided to follow different paths leading to the suspension of the company's activities until the end of 2018. In December 2018, IntellCorp initiated a new project, with the original founder Ruben Ribeiro, and current CEO, acquiring other companies and expanding the areas of operation and the project. IntellCorp became IntellCorp Group.

Ruben Ribeiro worked as an Intelligence Officer at the Strategic Defense Information Service (SIED) where he worked both in strategic and tactical analysis as well as in the operational area. In 2014, Ribeiro at his request left SIED and transferred to the Presidência do Conselho de Ministros (PCM) Ruben Ribeiro gained recognition after a Portuguese newspaper published an article about IntellCorp and after a question by a member of Parliament to the Prime Minister , about the legality of IntellCorp and Ruben Ribeiro's participation in the project. The Office of the Prime Minister stated that, after careful consideration, all legal issues were satisfied and there was no wrongdoing.

IntellCorp Group is the first Portuguese-speaking consortium , specializing in global intelligence and security for both the public and the private sector. The company also works on protecting individuals, companies, organizations and governments from criminal or terrorist threats and elements.

Intellcorp Group not only facilitates the entry of other companies into the Portuguese-speaking or foreign markets by connecting them with decision makers and influencers but also engages in political advisory activities for politicians and leaders. For instance, Intellcorp supports the Dhlakama family (Mozambique) in their business and image interests along with Henriques Afonso Dhlakama, son of the late RENAMO leader, in his announced candidacy for the upcoming Mozambican Presidential elections, in 2024.

The company has recruited over 70 employees including former intelligence officers, diplomats, ex-security forces personnel, ex-special forces and analysts, garnering extensive media coverage.

Intellcorp is a member of AFCEA.
