= Queluz, Portugal =

Queluz
- City
- Queluz National Palace

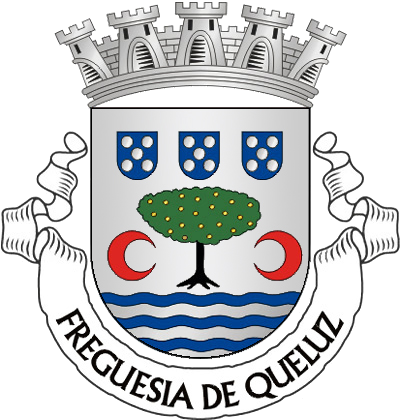
- Coat of arms

- Location of the town of Queluz
- Coordinates: 38°45′05″N 9°15′59″W
- Country: Portugal
- Region: Lisbon
- Subregion: Greater Lisbon
- District: Lisbon
- Municipality: Sintra
- Municipality: Sintra
- Parishes: 3: Massamá; Monte Abraão; Queluz

Population (2001)
  - Total: 78,273
- Demonym: Queluzense
- Time zone: UTC0 (WET)
  - Summer (DST): UTC+1 (WEST)
- 2745-NNN: 2745-000:2745-999
- Postal Zone: (+351) 21X XXX XXX
- ISO 3166 code: PT
- Website: http://www.cm-sintra.pt

Queluz (Portuguese pronunciation: [kɛˈluʃ]) is a city within the Sintra Municipality, on the Portuguese Riviera, in the Lisbon metropolitan area of Portugal. It is famed as the home of Queluz National Palace, the 18th century pleasure palace of the Portuguese Royal Family, as well as notable institutions like the Portuguese School of Equestrian Art. Queluz had a population 78,273 inhabitants in 2001.

== History ==
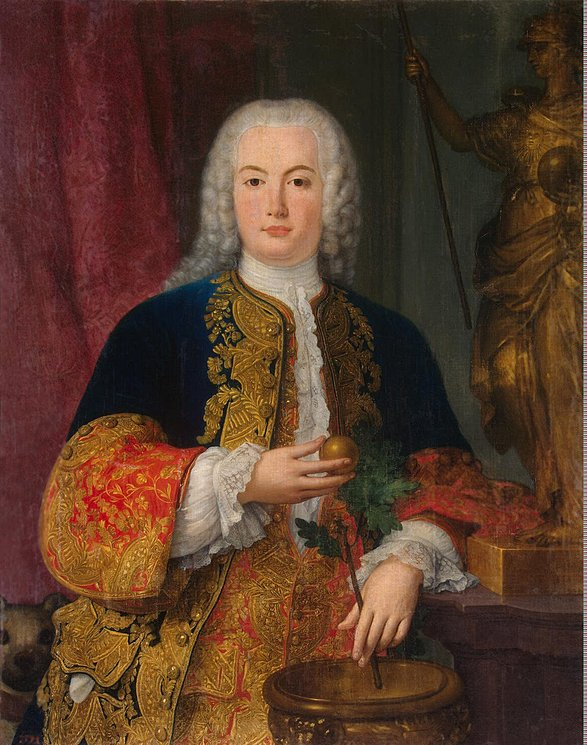
King Pedro III of Portugal built Queluz National Palace.

The origin of the name Queluz has been disputed over time. The prevailing thesis, by David Lim and José Pedro Machado, suggests that the name had its origin in the Arabic terms câ (for tight valley) and Llûs (meaning almond), affirming the suggestion that it was in The Valley of the Almond Tree. However, another suggestion, has it as forming from the Mountain of Light, Monte Abraão (the Mount of Abraham), where worship of the sun was common.

Human occupation of this area dates back to the Late Neolithic or early Chalcolithic (between the third and fourth millennium B.C.), owing to the number of Neolithic monuments and vestiges from abandoned settlements unearthed by archeologists. These earliest date established to this settlement was 4200 B.C., followed by comparable settlements in 2000 B.C. (in what today is the civil parish of Massamá).

In the year 1147, when Afonso I of Portugal forces conquered the city of Lisbon, a similar campaign within the Sintra mountains effectively captures the heath of Queluz, bringing the lands under Christian control.

From the first century until the 18th century, the region was primarily agrarian, occupied by homes, farms and few estates established by the clergy and/or nobility.

In the 18th century, Infante Pedro of Braganza (future King Pedro III of Portugal), in his capacity as Lord of the House of the Infantado, acquired an estate in Queluz, previously belonging to the Marquis of Castelo Rodrigo, and subsequently built a humble hunting lodge. Following his marriage to Queen Maria I of Portugal, the estate was radically expanded into the Rococo pleasure palace, today known as the Queluz National Palace.

Following the transfer of the Portuguese Royal Court to Queluz, during the reign of Queen Maria I and King Pedro III, numerous members of the Portuguese nobility established estates and palaces in the area, Sintra being the longtime retreat of the Portuguese aristocracy.

== Culture ==
The Portuguese School of Equestrian Art is based in Queluz.

Between July and August there is a free fair outside the D. Maria Pousada that recreates the golden age of the Queluz National Palace. The Feira Setecentista ("Eighteenth-Century Fair") recreates the reign of Queen Mary I of Portugal, and transports visitors back into a period where artisans and merchants produced arts and crafts. Choral concerts are also common to Sunday afternoons at Queluz National Palace, owing to the three choirs in the city.

Similarly, the Monte Abraão Fair (held every Saturday in the Rua Cidade Desportiva) is the biggest in Queluz, allowing the sale of clothes, handicrafts, fruits and vegetables, flowers and implements.

=== Sport ===
The biggest and most known teams in Queluz are Real Sport Clube, CA Queluz and JOMA (Juventude Operária do Monte Abraão).

Real Sport Clube is Queluz's local football team, CA Queluz is for basketball, and JOMA's main sport is athletics. Real Sport Clube plays on the Segunda Liga (the 2nd biggest league competition in Portugal).

CA Queluz were Portuguese basketball champions in 1984 and 2005. They also won the Portuguese Cup in 1983 and 2005, completing the double.

JOMA have been Portuguese champions in both individual and collective athletics competitions.

== Geography ==
Crossed by Jamor river, the city is interspersed by various parks, with three in the district: two in the civil parish of Queluz and the other in Massamá:

- Forest of Queluz (Portuguese: Matinha de Queluz) is a small enclosed, isolated wooded area. It covers 21 hectares, and is sustained due to its public use, ecological wealth and as a relic of vegetation climate.
- Salgueiro Maia Park (Portuguese: Parque de Salgueiro Maia) is a small one-hectare park. It is open from 9:30 in the morning to early evening, 8:00 p.m. It has manicured lawns, an amphitheatre and a playground, that is also used for sport.
- Felício Loureiro Park (Portuguese: Parque de Felício Loureiro), another emblematic park, is fairly wooded and equipped for recreation, leisure and exercise. It is divided into two zones: the first extends along the river Jamor and includes the a sculpture of José Pedro Croft; the second includes an exercise circuit, as well as manicured grassy areas used for recreation and leisure.

=== Climate ===
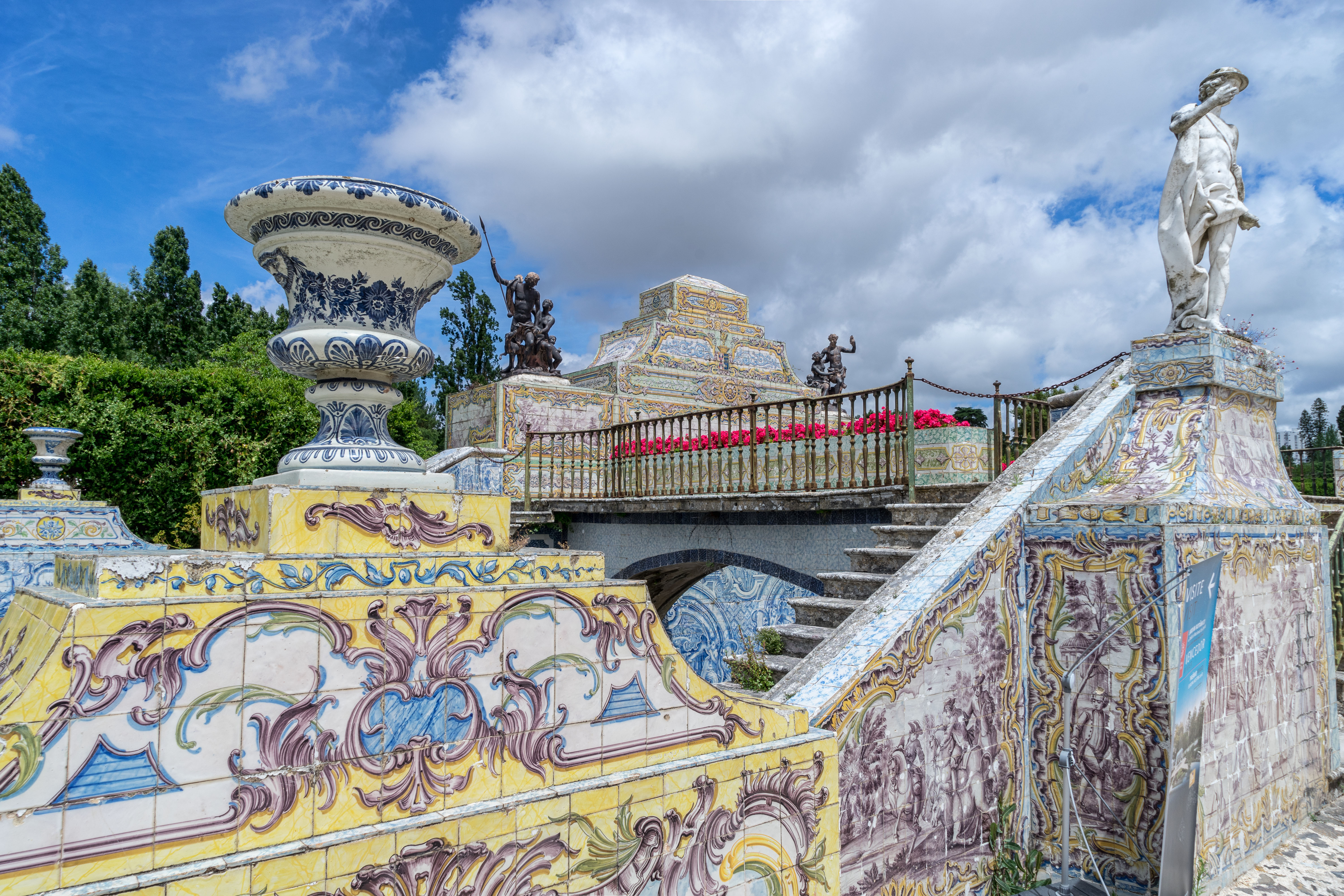
Queluz is famed for its gardens.

Population of Queluz (1930 - 2001)
Year	Pop.	±%
1930	3,225	—
1940	4,967	+54.0%
1950	7,968	+60.4%
1960	15,476	+94.2%
1970	27,815	+79.7%
1981	48,112	+73.0%
1991	60,370	+25.5%
2001	78,273	+29.7%

Queluz has a micro-climate that is classified as an Upper Thermo-Mediterranean sub-humid type, with average annual precipitation of 825 millimetres (32.5 in).

== Transport ==
With three train stations on the Sintra Line (Monte Abraão, Barcarena-Massamá and Queluz-Belas), Queluz falls within the Sintra-Lisbon corridor, with connections to Amadora and Sintra.

Vimeca bus lines connect Queluz to Oeiras, Lisbon, Amadora and Carcavelos.

Taxi services within Queluz are handled from the centralized "taxi squares" and services achieved from telephone services.

== Notable citizens ==
- Peter IV of Portugal (12 October 1798, Queluz – 24 September 1834, Queluz), son of John VI of Portugal and Carlota Joaquina of Spain, he became King Peter IV of Portugal, before abdicating in favour of his daughter Maria da Gloria; he became the founder and first ruler of the Empire of Brazil, before abdicating this title in favour of his son, returning to Portugal to reclaim the throne for his daughter in the Liberal Wars;
- Miguel I of Portugal (26 October 1802, Queluz – 14 November 1866, Bronnbach, Grand Duchy of Baden), was the King of Portugal between 1828 and 1834, the seventh child and second son of King John VI and his queen, Charlotte of Spain, he was a rebellious youth, who eventually seized the throne from his niece, Maria II of Portugal, inspiring the Liberal Wars with his brother Peter IV of Portugal
- António José Enes (15 August 1848, Lisbon – 6 August 1901, Queluz), journalist, dramatist, librarian, government minister, colonial administrator and diplomat, who worked for several newspapers/magazines, eventually writing the controversial, anti-clerical drama "Os Lazaristas", and defended the concept of a "United States of Europe", fearing that Portugal would be absorbed by Spain;
