= John Cheere =

English sculptor

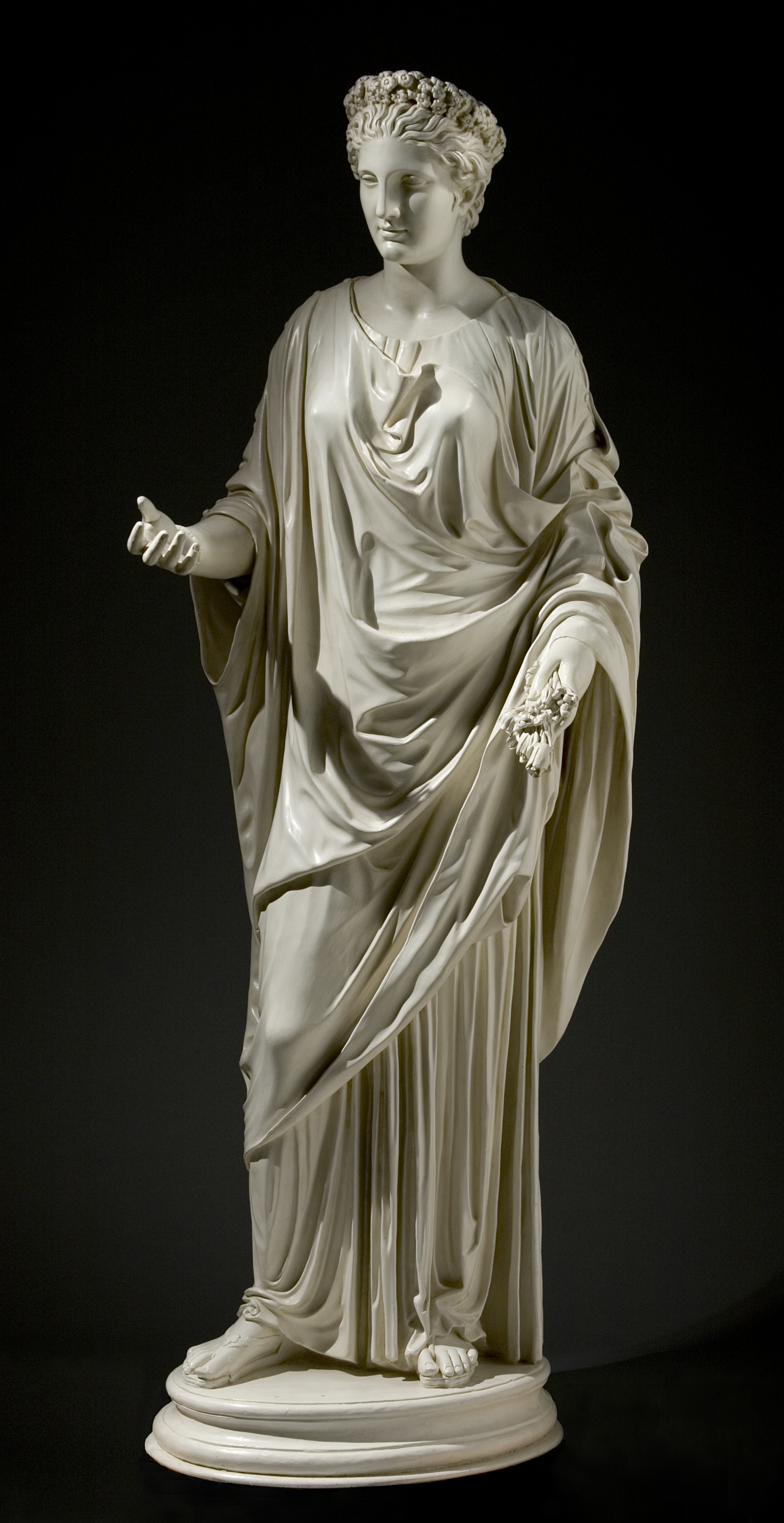
Cheere's painted plaster sculpture, The Capitoline "Flora", 1767.

John Cheere (1709–1787) was an English sculptor, born in London. The younger brother of the sculptor Sir Henry Cheere, he was originally apprenticed as a haberdasher from 1725 to 1732.

== Life ==
He was born in Clapham the son of Sarah and John Cheere. Around 1722 he joined his brother Henry Cheere in the sculpture yard of John Nost and when Henry set up his own yard around 1730, John joined him as a partner. However, in 1739 John returned to Nost's yard which had been unused or underused since Nost's death in 1729. John bought the yard and a number of lead moulds for casting lead statues (which were normally painted in those days).

He is now mainly remembered as a creator of lead statues standing in the gardens of stately homes. Some of these (other than the casting) logically may be the artistic work of Nost rather than Cheere. These kinds of sculptures were popular for the summer houses of the 18th century’s aristocracy.

Some were reproductions of classical Roman or Greek sculptures, but there was also a demand for statues depicting simple, pastoral themes.

Several of the sculptures from Queluz had not been on public view since 1967, and have been restored by Rupert Harris Conservation, in London, and returned to Portugal in May 2009. This restoration was in part made possible by the World Monuments Fund Britain.

The Medici lions at Stowe House have been attributed to Cheere.

He died in 1787 and was buried in Clapham with his first wife.

== Works ==
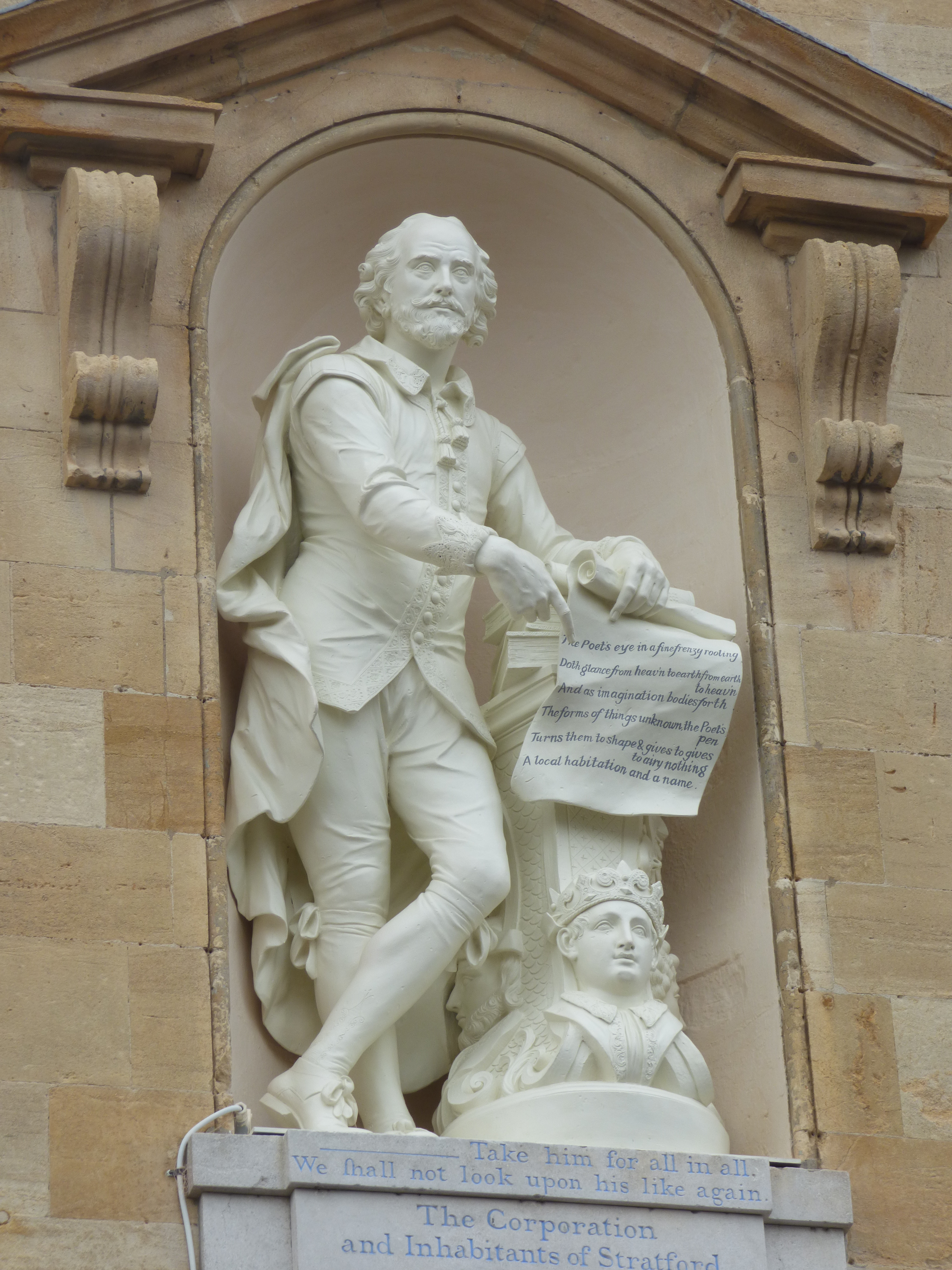
Restored statue of William Shakespeare at Stratford Town Hall

- Bust on grave of James Lawes on his grave in Halfway Church, Jamaica (c.1734)
- Gilded equestrian statue of William III in St James's Square, London (1739)
- Thirteen busts for Sir John Evelyn at Wotton House, Surrey (1742 to 1745)
- Eight plaster busts for Earl Fitzwalter at Moulsham Hall (1743)
- Several chimneypieces for Kirtlington Park (1748)
- Gilded lead statue of George II for Saint Helier, Jersey (1751)
- Numerous figures for the grottoes and gardens at Stourhead (1751 to 1766)
- Lead figure of Mars in Hampton Court gardens (1752)
- Plaster busts for Henry Hoare's house in Clapham (1753)
- 98 lead statues ordered by the Portuguese minister in London for the royal palace of Queluz (1756)
- Nine mythological figures for the gardens of Longford Castle (1759 to 1768)
- Two large wyverns commissioned by Bishop Trevor, Bishop of Durham, to flank the entrance to Glynde Place (1759)
- Six lead figures and two lead busts for Bowood House (1762/3)
- Four figures for the Pantheon at Stourhead (1766)
- Lead statue of Shakespeare for Stratford-upon-Avon Town Hall commissioned by Garrick (1769) painted white around 2015
- Two sphinxes for the bridge at Blenheim Palace (1773) (later moved nearer to house)
- Busts of Shakespeare, Plato, Homer and Aristotle for Josiah Wedgwood (1774)
- Four Sphinxes for Somerset House (1778)
- Various lead animals for Castle Hill, Devon commissioned by Lord Clinton (dnk)
- Two lead figures at Castle Howard (dnk)
- Figure of Shakespeare in Drury Lane Theatre presented by Samuel Whitbread (dnk)

== Family ==
His first wife, Theodosia Maria, was from the parish of St. Georges near Hanover Square, London, but died in May 1767, soon after the death of both her father and only son. He then married Mary Wilmot of Clapham on 30 June 1768. They had no children. On Cheeere's death he left his assets to a nephew, Charles Cheere.

== Gallery ==
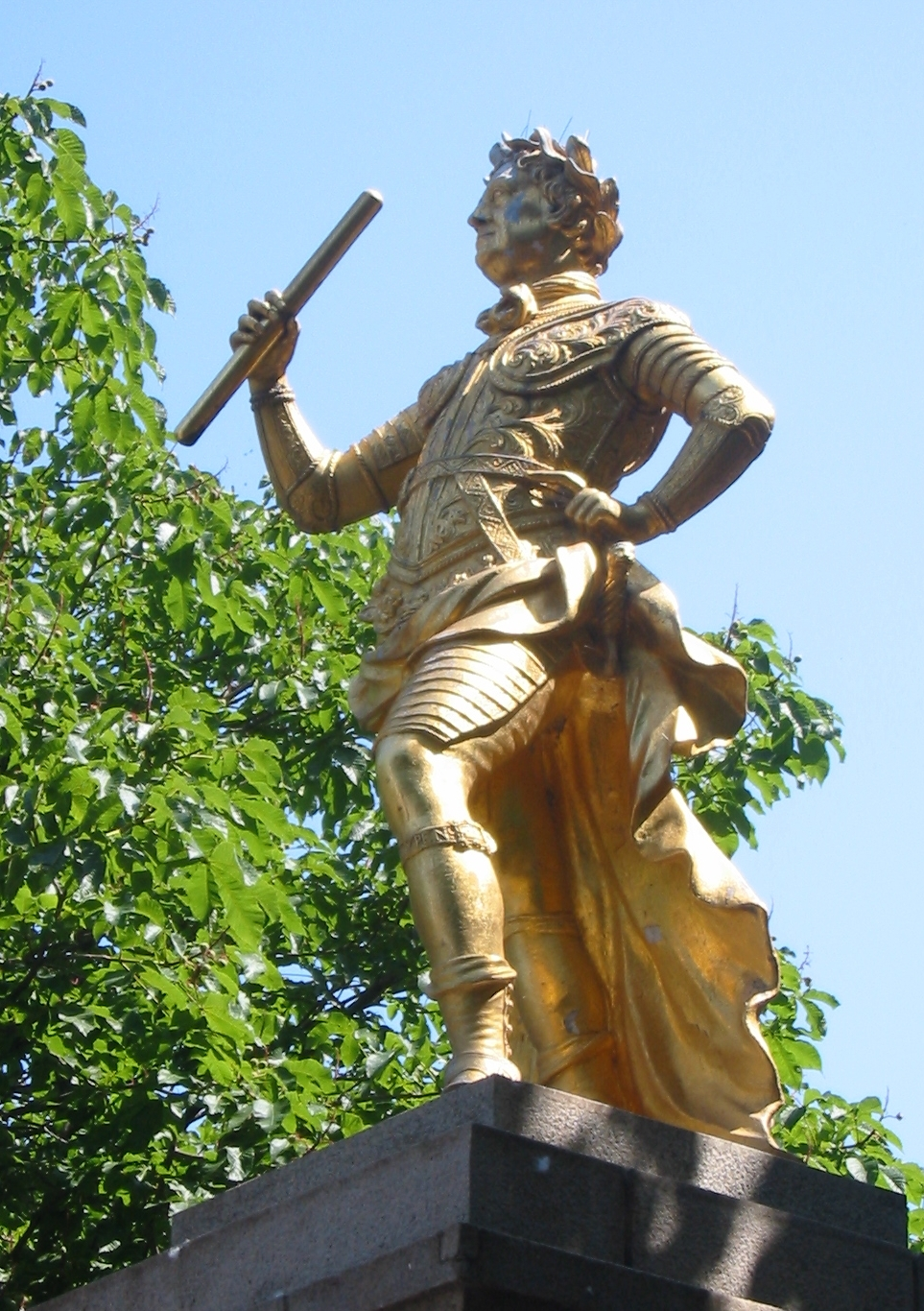
George II (1751) in the Royal Square, Saint Helier

Shepherdess (c. 1760-70), at Kew Gardens, London

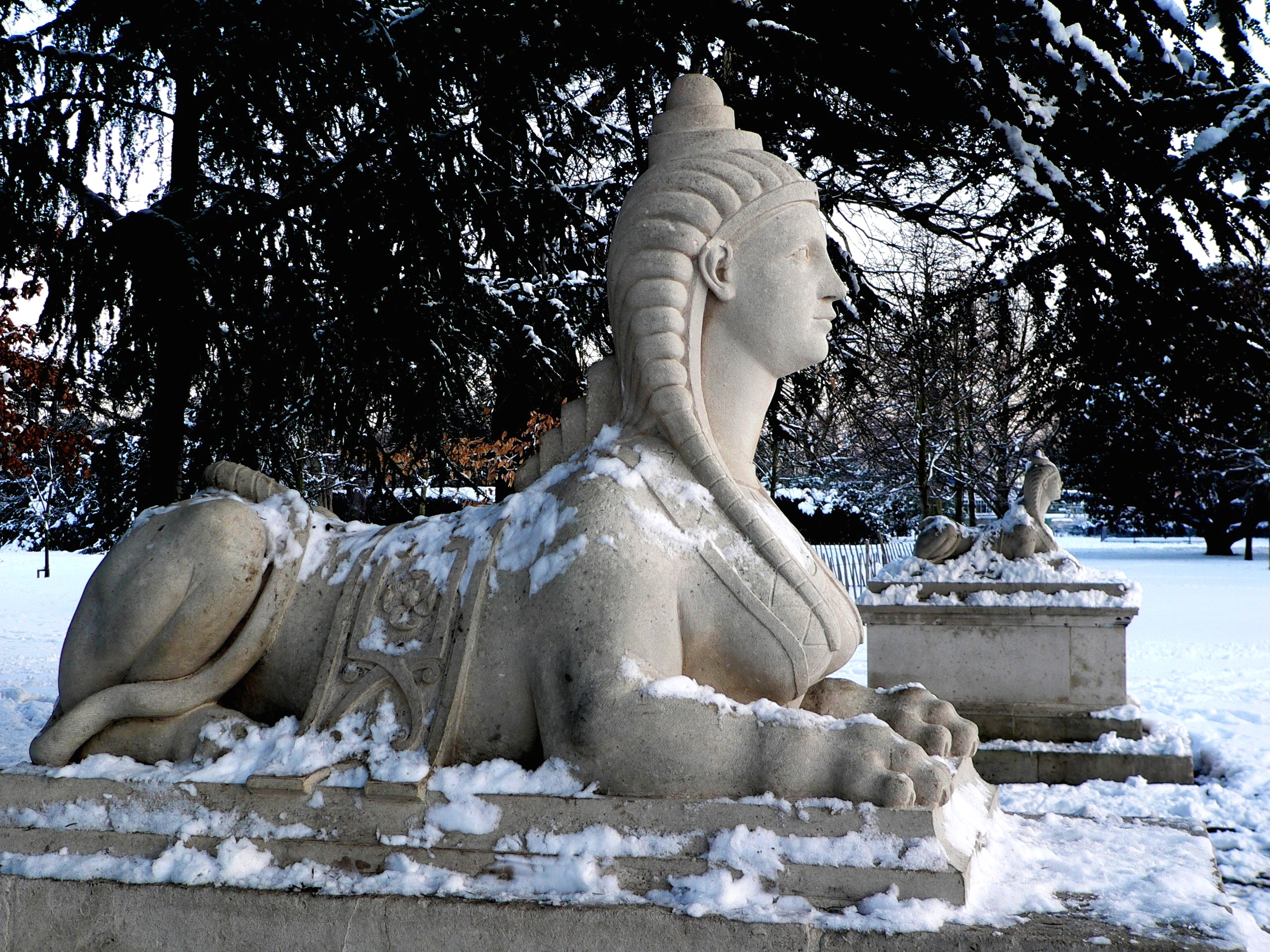
Sphinx at Chiswick House

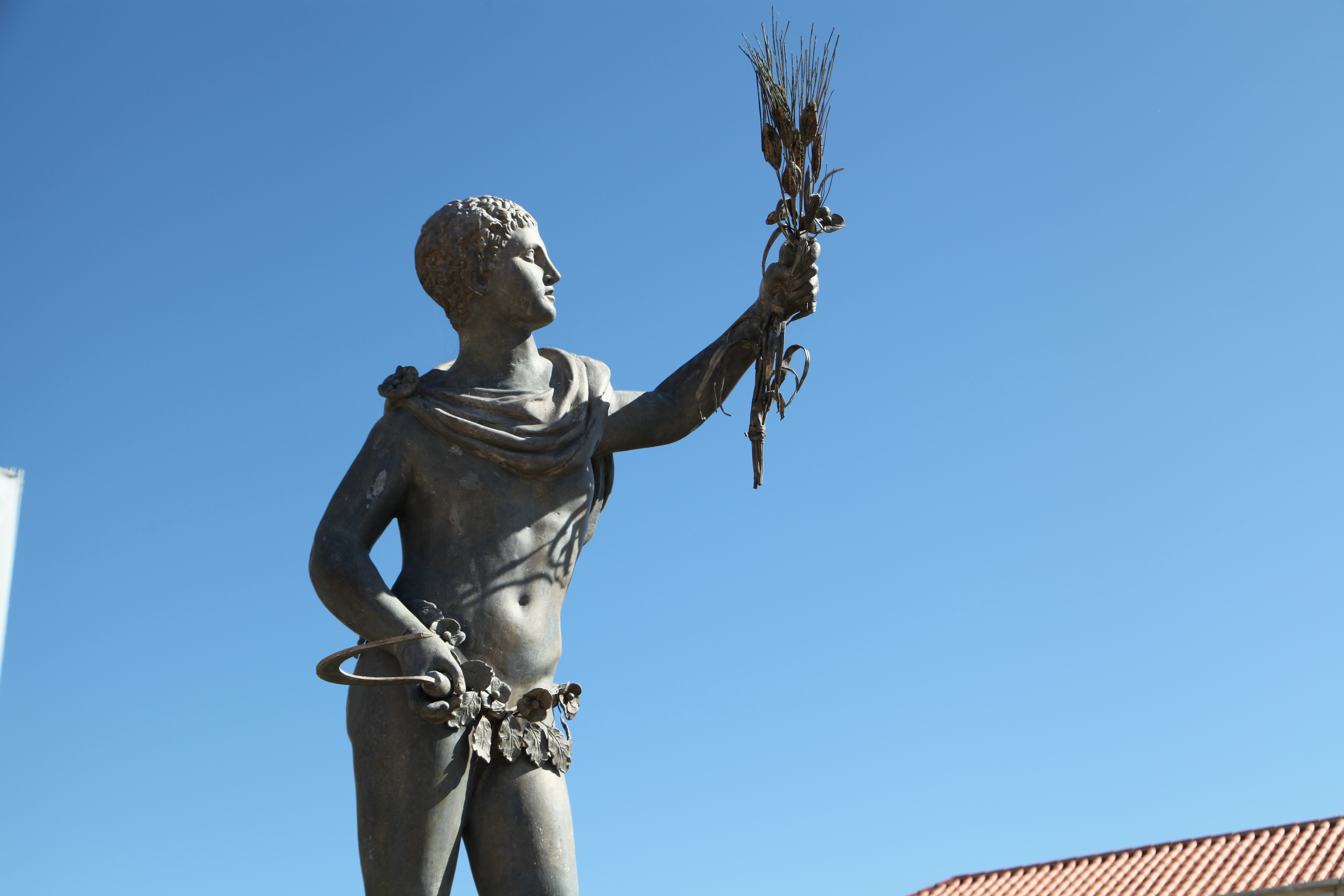
Summer at Queluz National Palace, Portugal

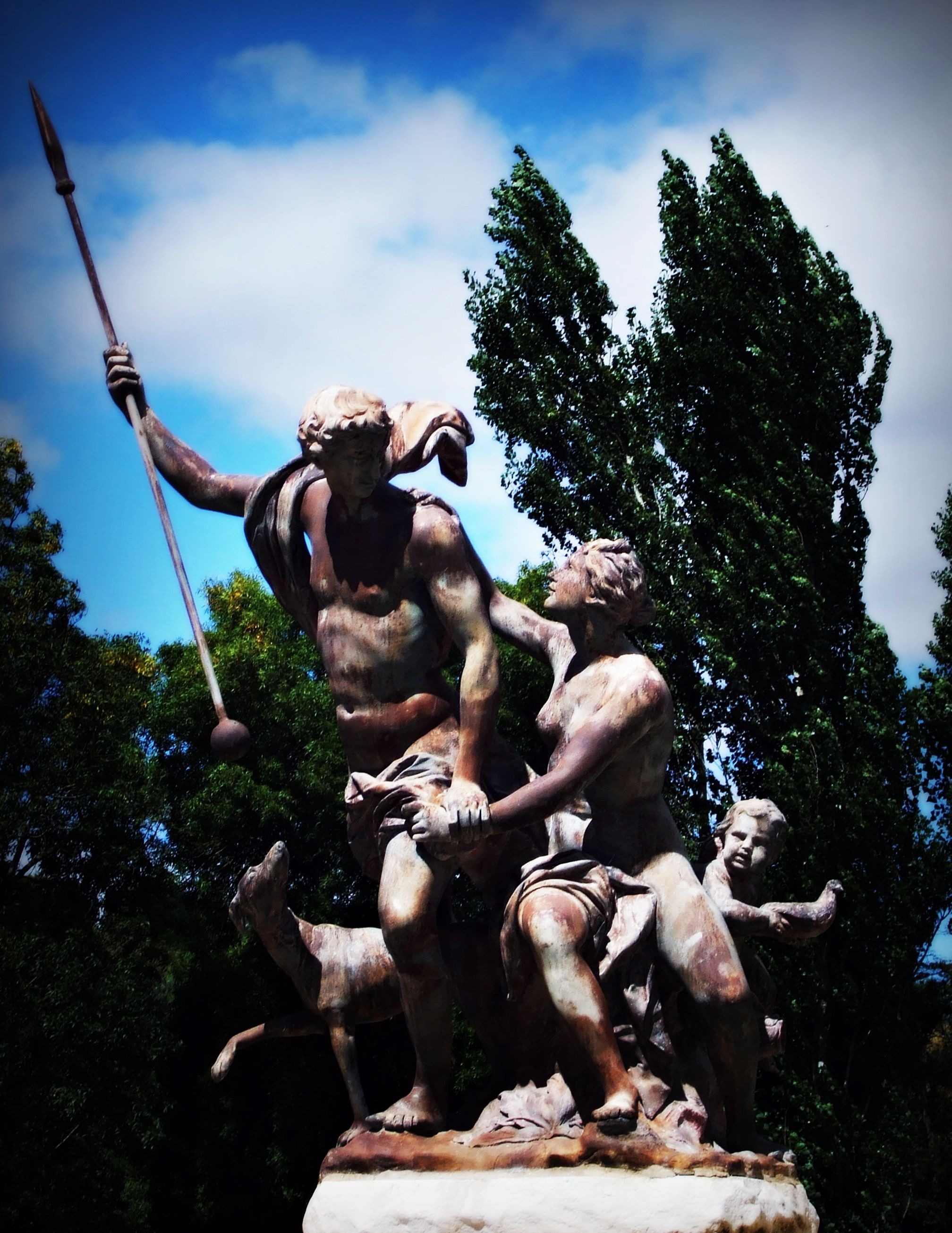
Bacchus and Ariadne at Queluz National Palace, Portugal

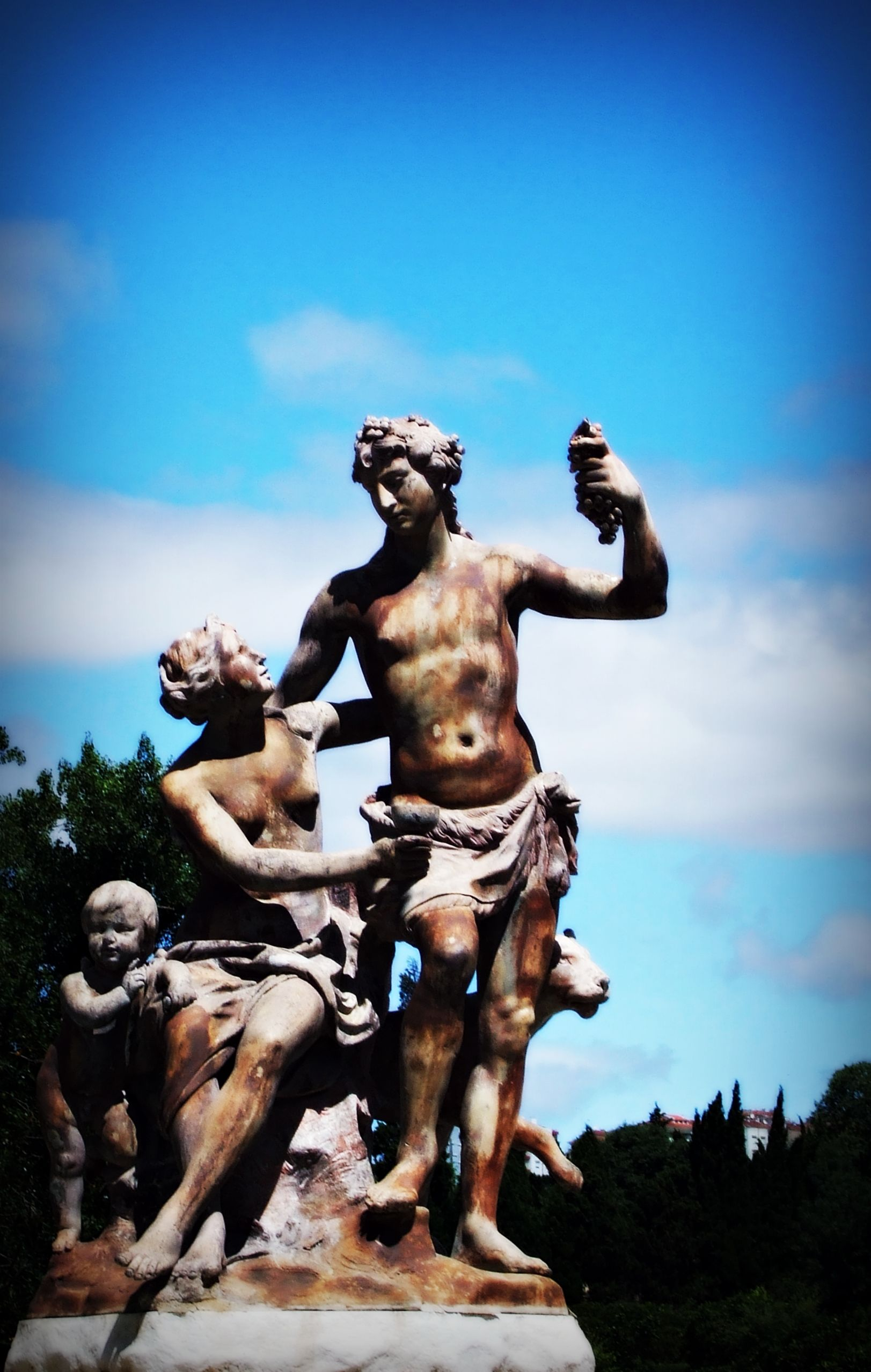
Venus and Adonis at Queluz National Palace, Portugal

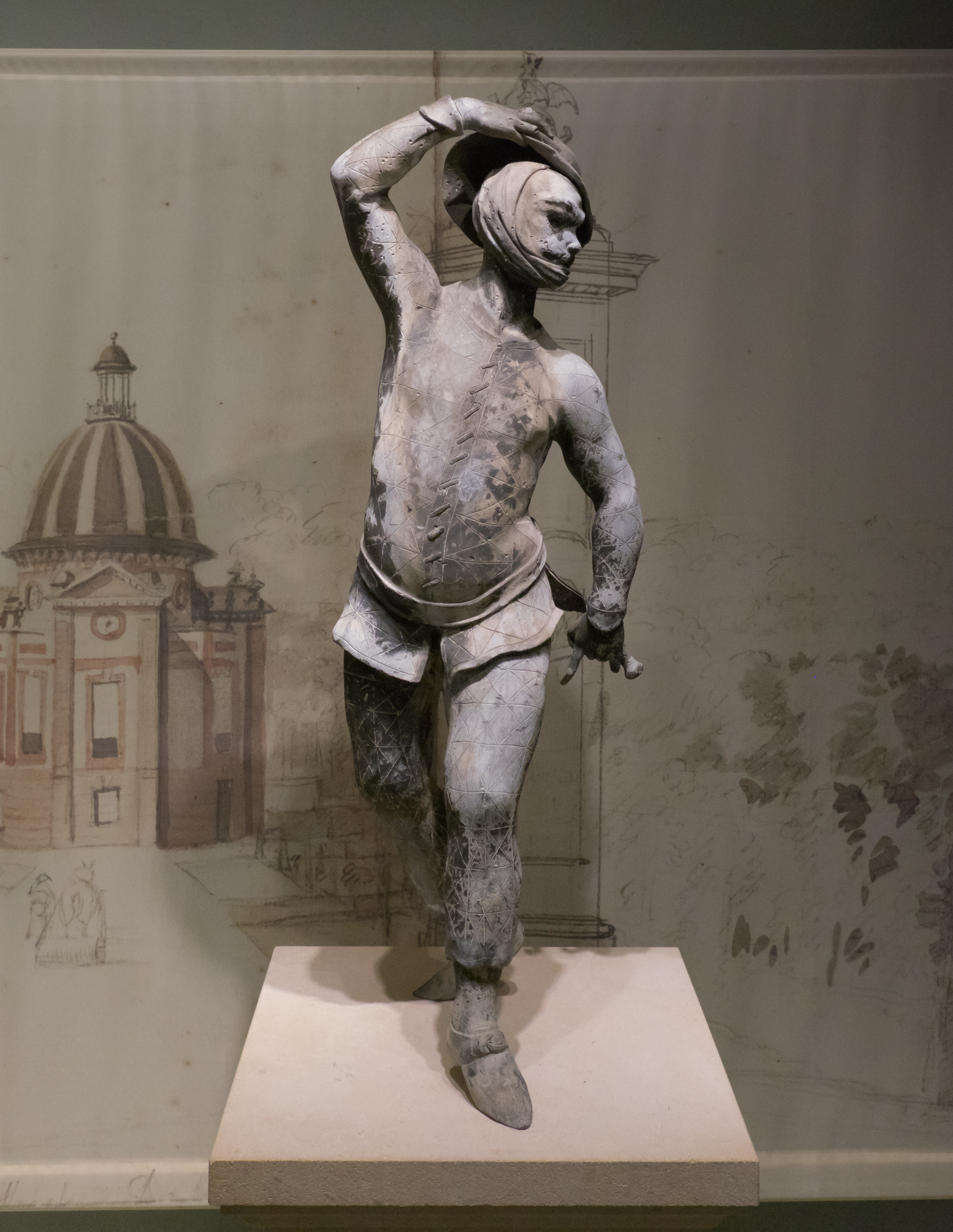
Harlequin at Wrest Park, England

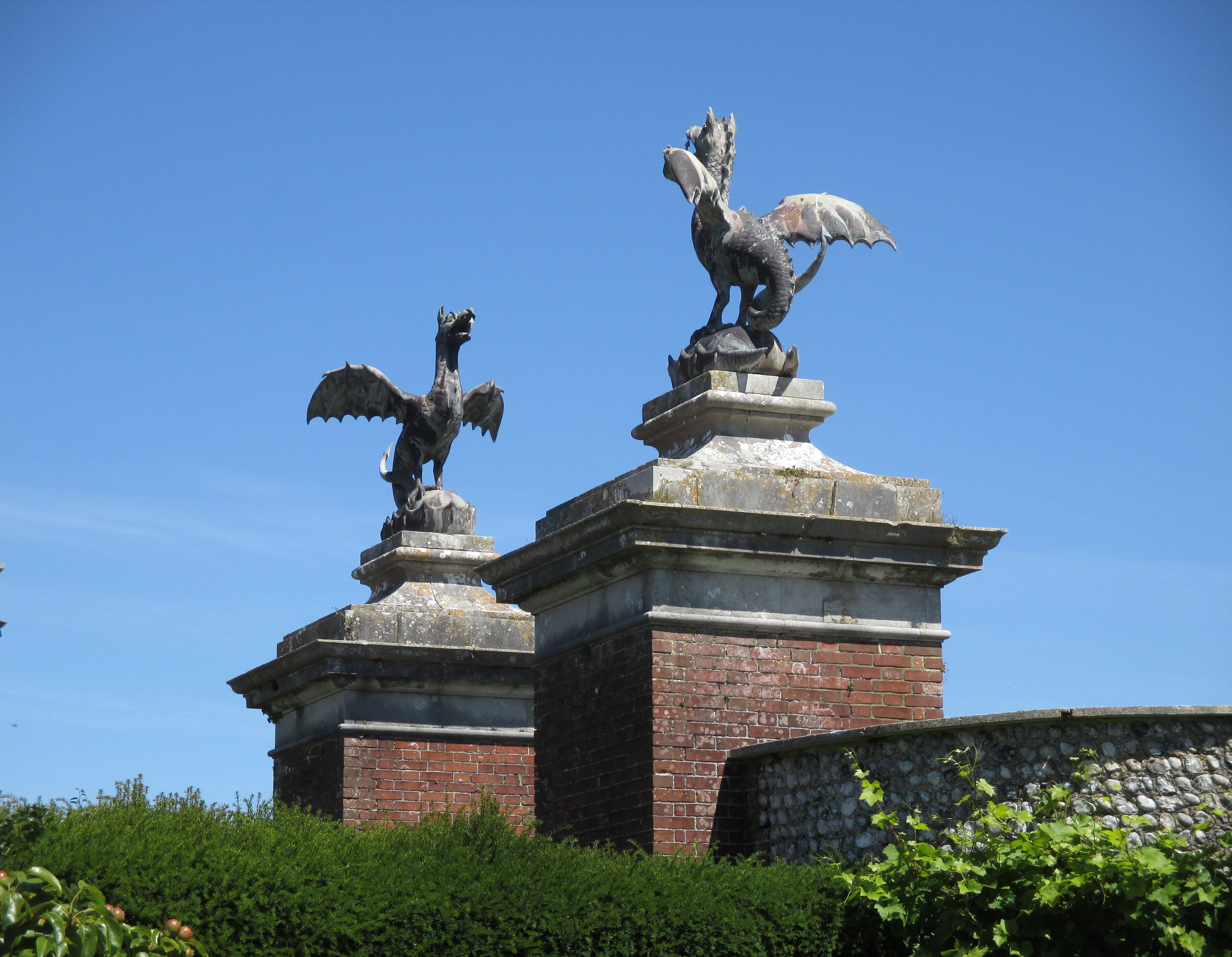
Glynde Place wyverns

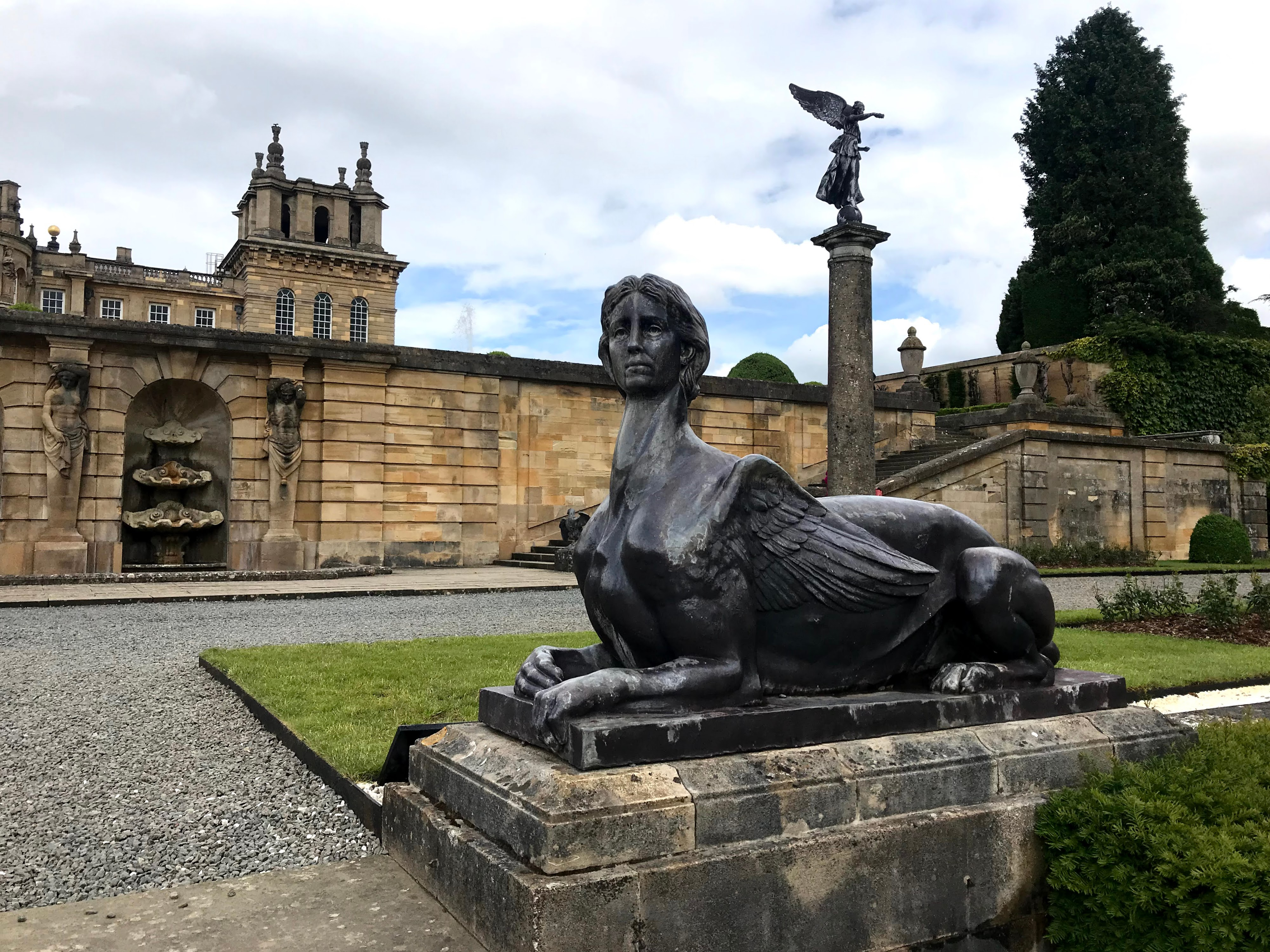
Sphinx at Blenheim Palace
