= Queluz (Sintra) =

- Civil parish
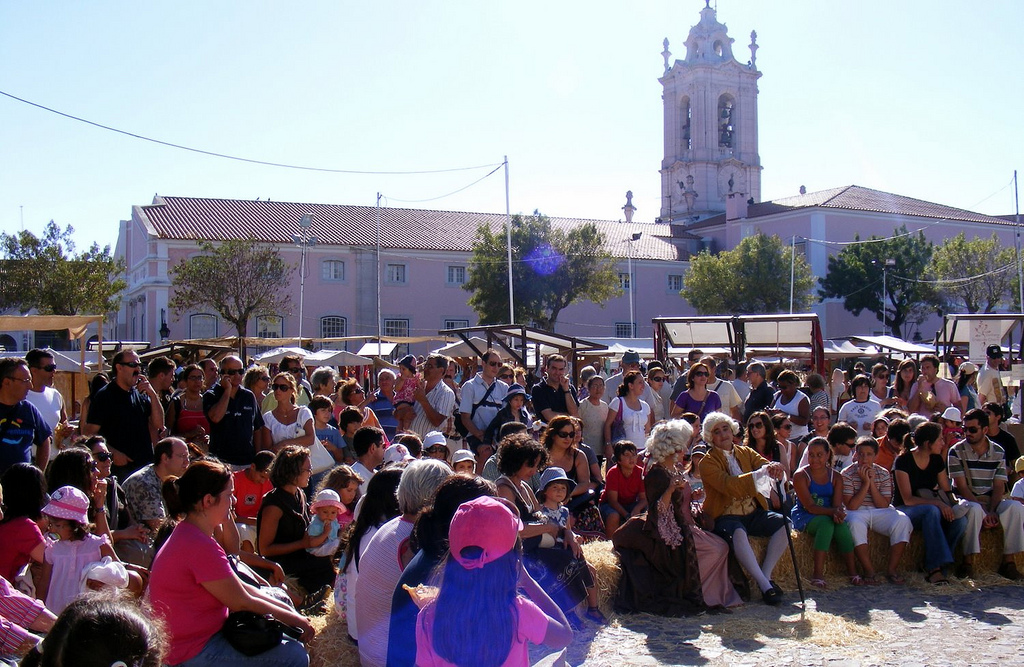
- 17th century fair in the shadow of the Queluz National Palace

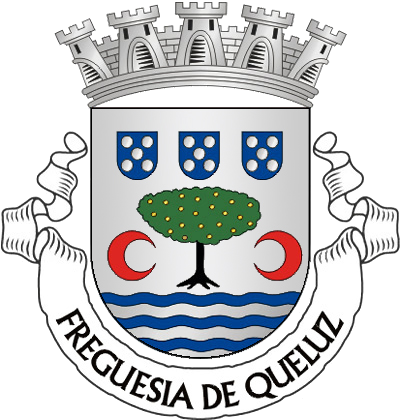
- Coat of arms

- Location in Portugal
- Coordinates: 38°45′N 9°15′W
- Country: Portugal
- Region: Lisbon
- Metropolitan area: Lisbon
- District: Lisbon
- Municipality: Sintra
- Disbanded: 2013

Area
  - Total: 3.63 km^{2} (1.40 sq mi)

Population (2011)
  - Total: 26,248
  - Density: 7,230/km^{2} (18,700/sq mi)
- Time zone: UTC+00:00 (WET)
  - Summer (DST): UTC+01:00 (WEST)
- Postal code: 2745-061
- Area code: 214
- Patron: Nossa Senhora da Conceição
- Website: http://www.queluz.org/

Queluz (Portuguese pronunciation: [kɛˈluʃ]) is a former civil parish in the municipality of Sintra, Lisbon District, Portugal. In 2013, the parish merged into the new parish Queluz e Belas. The population in 2011 was 26,248, in an area of 3.63 km^{2}. The parish covered part of the city of Queluz.

== History ==
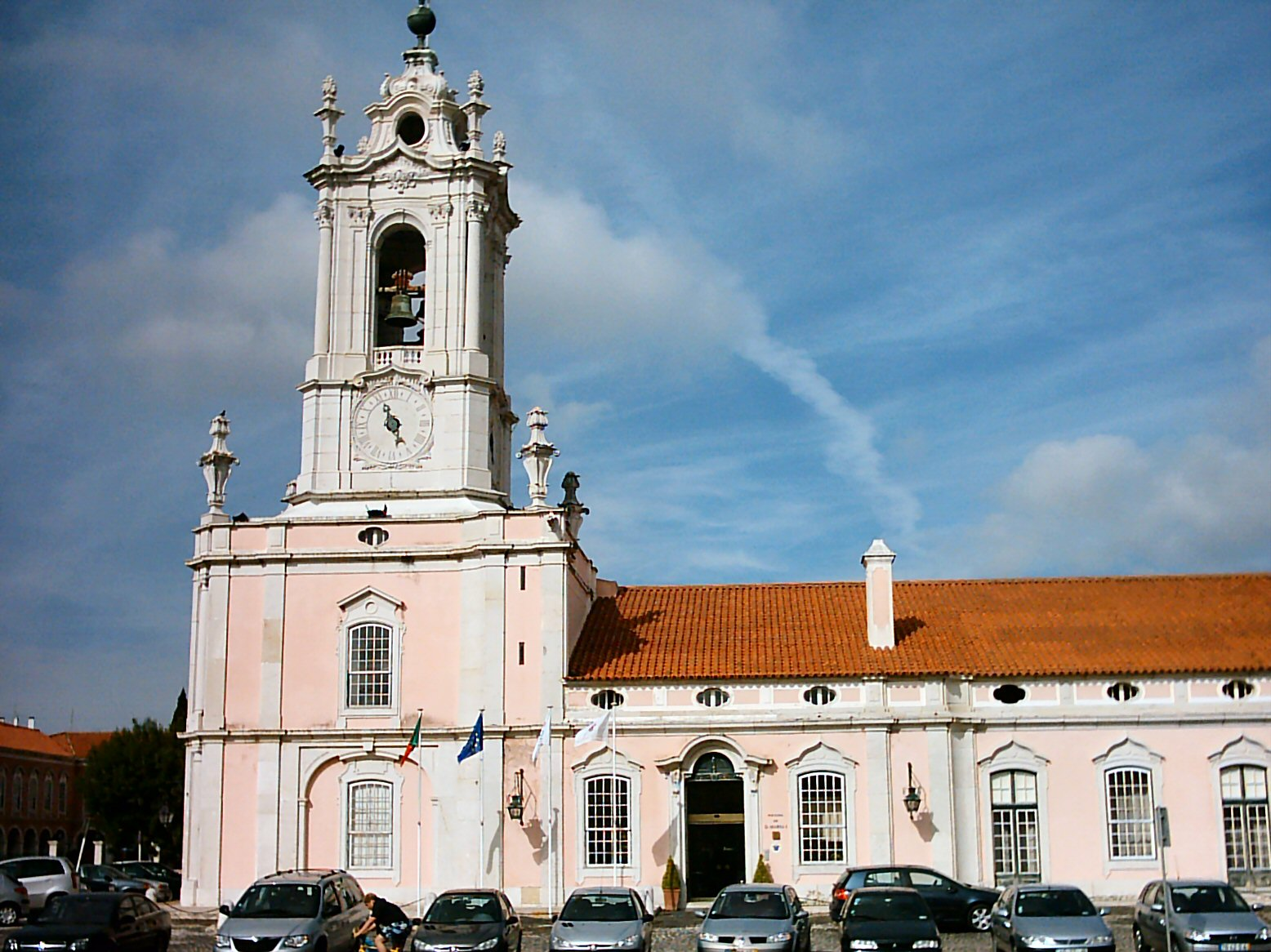
The Pousada de Dona Maria, Queluz

On 29 June 1925, the parish of Queluz was created from part of the parish of Belas (article 1, Decree 1:790, 29 June 1925). The parish was elevated to town (vila) status on 18 September 1961. In 1997 the parishes Massamá and Monte Abraão were de-annexed from the parish of Queluz, and together they were elevated to city (cidade) status.

Since 29 June 2001, the parish council was installed on Rua Conde de Almeida Araújo, while the former installations were remodelled, resulting in the Sala Multiusos Fernando Ribeiro Leitão (which received artists' expositions, cultural events and meetings of the parish).

The parish council remodelled the historical public washing-house, a protocol signed between the 23 Group of the Associação de Escuteiros de Portugal and the Grupo Coral de Queluz (the two entities that now occupy the edifice). In 2004, a shop along Avenida da República, was acquired to decentralize services.

== Architecture ==
- Aqueduct of Gargantada (Aqueduto da Gargantada)
- Residence Rua Almeida Araújo, 12 (Casa na Rua Almeida Araújo, n.º12)
