= Massamá =

- Civil parish
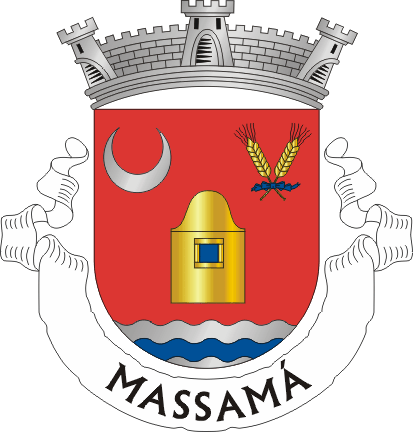
- Coat of arms

- Location in Portugal
- Coordinates: 38.757°N 9.275°W
- Country: Portugal
- Region: Lisbon
- Metropolitan area: Lisbon
- District: Lisbon
- Municipality: Sintra
- Disbanded: 2013

Area
  - Total: 2.78 km^{2} (1.07 sq mi)

Population (2011)
  - Total: 28,112
  - Density: 10,000/km^{2} (26,000/sq mi)
- Time zone: UTC+00:00 (WET)
  - Summer (DST): UTC+01:00 (WEST)

Massamá (Portuguese pronunciation: [mɐsɐˈma]) is a former civil parish in the municipality of Sintra, Lisbon District, Portugal. In 2013, the parish merged into the new parish Massamá e Monte Abraão. The population in 2011 was 28,112, in an area of 2.78 km².

It was separated from Queluz after a big conflict between, the at the time Massamá's president Mário Humberto Vieira and Marcelo Rebelo de Sousa Grand-Grand-Grand-father in 1807. The parish consists of three different zones. The old zone is known as the 2nd phase, a newer zone is known as the 6th phase, while the newest zone, Massamá-Norte (North Massamá, also known as 7th phase) is located outside the parish of Massamá, belonging to Belas parish, though it is usually considered as a zone from Massamá, as it is connected to the rest of Massamá. Belas town is actually several kilometers from Massamá Norte.

The name Massamá comes from the Mozarabic term “Mactama” which means “place with good water” or “fountain”. Due to its location between Sintra and Lisbon, this was the place where ancient warriors would take a break to rest and drink water from the local springs.

== Notable people ==
- Pedro Passos Coelho, Prime Minister of Portugal, lives in Massamá.
