= Pousada de Dona Maria I =

Pousada of D. Maria
- Pousada de D. Maria
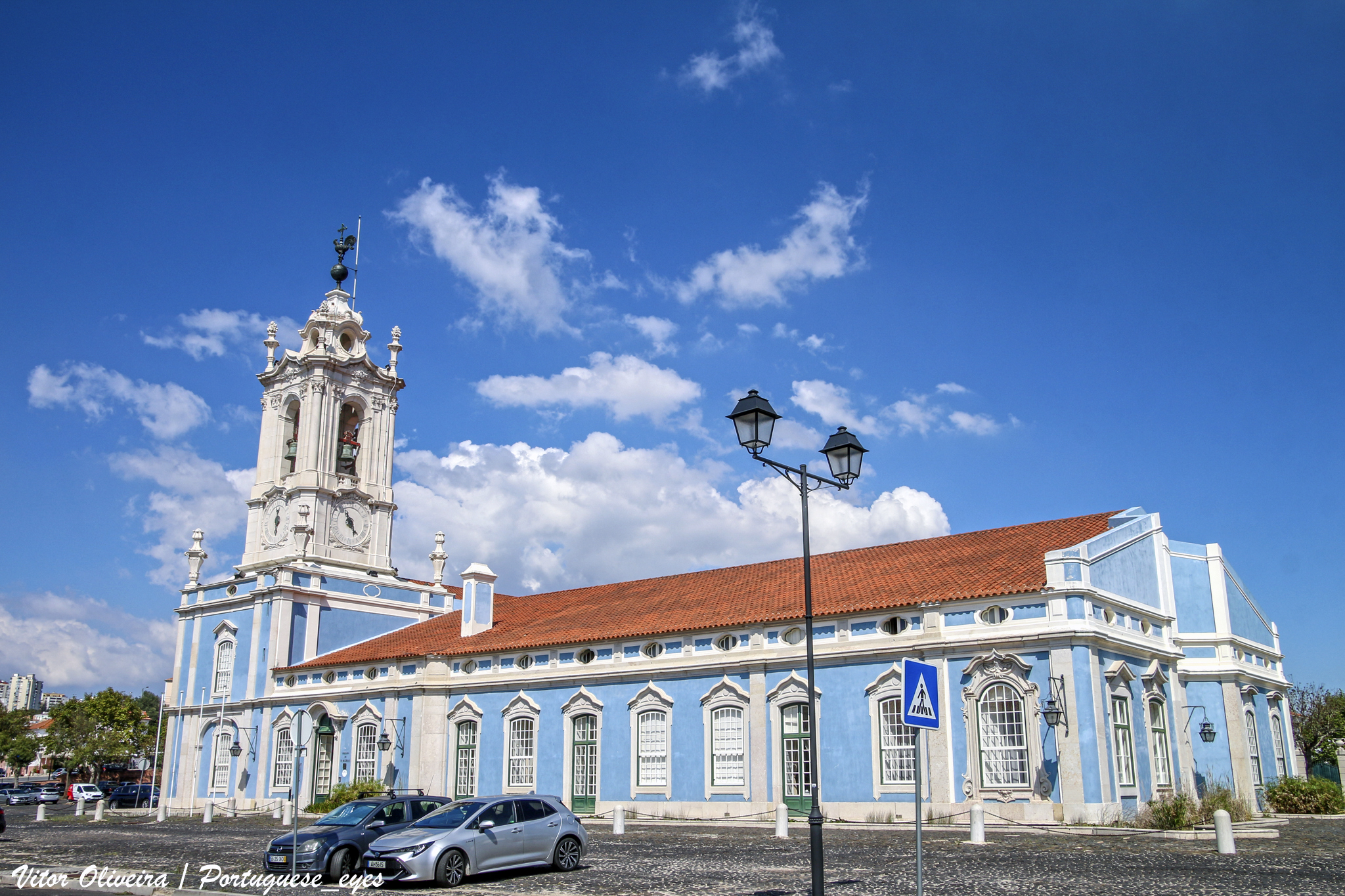
- The southern profile of the
- Interactive map of the Pousada of D. Maria area

General information
- Type: Inn
- Architectural style: Baroque
- Location: Queluz, Sintra, Portugal
- Coordinates: 38°45′3.23″N 9°15′27.19″W
- Opening: c.1654
- Owner: Portuguese Republic

Technical details
- Material: Masonry

Design and construction
- Architect: Manuel Caetano de Sousa

The Pousada of D. Maria is part of the Pousadas de Portugal network of lodgings, housed in the historical servants quarters/annex of the Queluz National Palace, located in the civil parish of Queluz in the municipality of Sintra in the Portuguese sub-region of Greater Lisbon.

Built in the Baroque-style, its five-stage bell tower provides an ecclesiastical appearance to the structure, due to surmounted floral finials. In age, it is contemporary with the main palace, dating from the mid-18th century. The tower is visible from many parts of the palace and from certain vantage points appears to be part of the palace itself.

== History ==
In 1654, the estate of Queluz, which pertained to the Marquess of Castelo Rodrigo, passes into the hands of the Royal Household, and incorporated into the Casa do Infantado.

Under the direction of the Infante Peter (later to be Peter III of Portugal after his marriage to Queen Maria, in 1747, construction begins on the National Palace of Queluz (which was intended as a summer retreat). A long project, around 1758 the remodeling of the palace was under the direction of Mateus Vicente de Oliveira, who was regularly required in Lisbon, to help in the reconstruction of the city. In his place Jean Baptiste Robillon, better known for his work on the palaces gardens, acted in his place. In 1782, after Robillon's death, the project at Queluz was placed in the hands of Manuel Caetano de Sousa, with the palace expanded to provide quarters for the Royal Guard, administration, stables and other dependencies, including the Torre do Relógio (Tower Clock). The first great leap in construction at Queluz ended with the death of Peter III in 1786. The wing was originally intended to house servants and the members of the Royal Guard when the Portuguese Royal Court was in residence at Queluz.

A decade later, the Palace was converted into the official residences of the Portuguese Royal family.

On the eve of the Portuguese revolution, King Manuel II ceded the estate to the National Treasury (Portuguese: Fazenda Nacional).

Around 1924, the spaces contiguous to the clock tower were used as a primary school.

In 1995, the Pousada D. Maria, was installed in the spaces of the tower and ancillary block, after extensive remodeling, under the direction of Carlos Oliveira Ramos. The building was named for Maria I of Portugal, whose consort (Peter III) initiated the transformation of the small estate into summer palace.

On 20 August 1996, a dispatch was opened to classify the building; on 23 October 2009, the process to classify the structure expired, under terms of the article 78, of Decree 309/2009, Diário da República, Série 1 (206).

== Architecture ==
The building, which is a singular feature of the palace's cour d'honneur, includes one wing which is curved to match the opposite lateral wall of the cour d'honneur. The building is isolated to the northeast, across an accessway from the main body of the National Palace and the buildings of the national Anti-Aircraft Artillery Regiment 1 complex.

The square tower block, was developed along two unequal axis's, resulting in staggered volumes: one surmounting a rectangular space, and the other, a rectangular extension curving slightly to match the cour d'honneur in the southwest palace complex. The space is addorsed along its southern extent by another rectangular body, with a two-story structure separated by stony frieze, its parapet decorated by stone pilasters (along the northern, eastern and western facades).

Visible on the principal (western) elevation is an axis with two overlapping windows. The superior body, of the clock tower, includes the clock (on the first register) and four arches for the bells (on the second register).
