= Portuguese School of Equestrian Art =

Classical riding academy

- Escola Portuguesa da Arte Equestre
- Queluz National Palace, seat of the Portuguese School of Equestrian Art
- Formation: 1726; 300 years ago Refounded: 1979
- Location: Queluz National Palace, Sintra, Portuguese Riviera
- Director: Lt. Col. Paulo Candoso
- Website: arteequestre.pt
- Formerly called: Royal Equestrian Academy; Real Picaria Portuguesa

The Escola Portuguesa de Arte Equestre (Portuguese School of Equestrian Art) is a Portuguese institution dedicated to the preservation of the equestrian arts, in the Portuguese tradition. It is one of the "Big Four", the most prestigious classical riding academies in the world.

== History ==
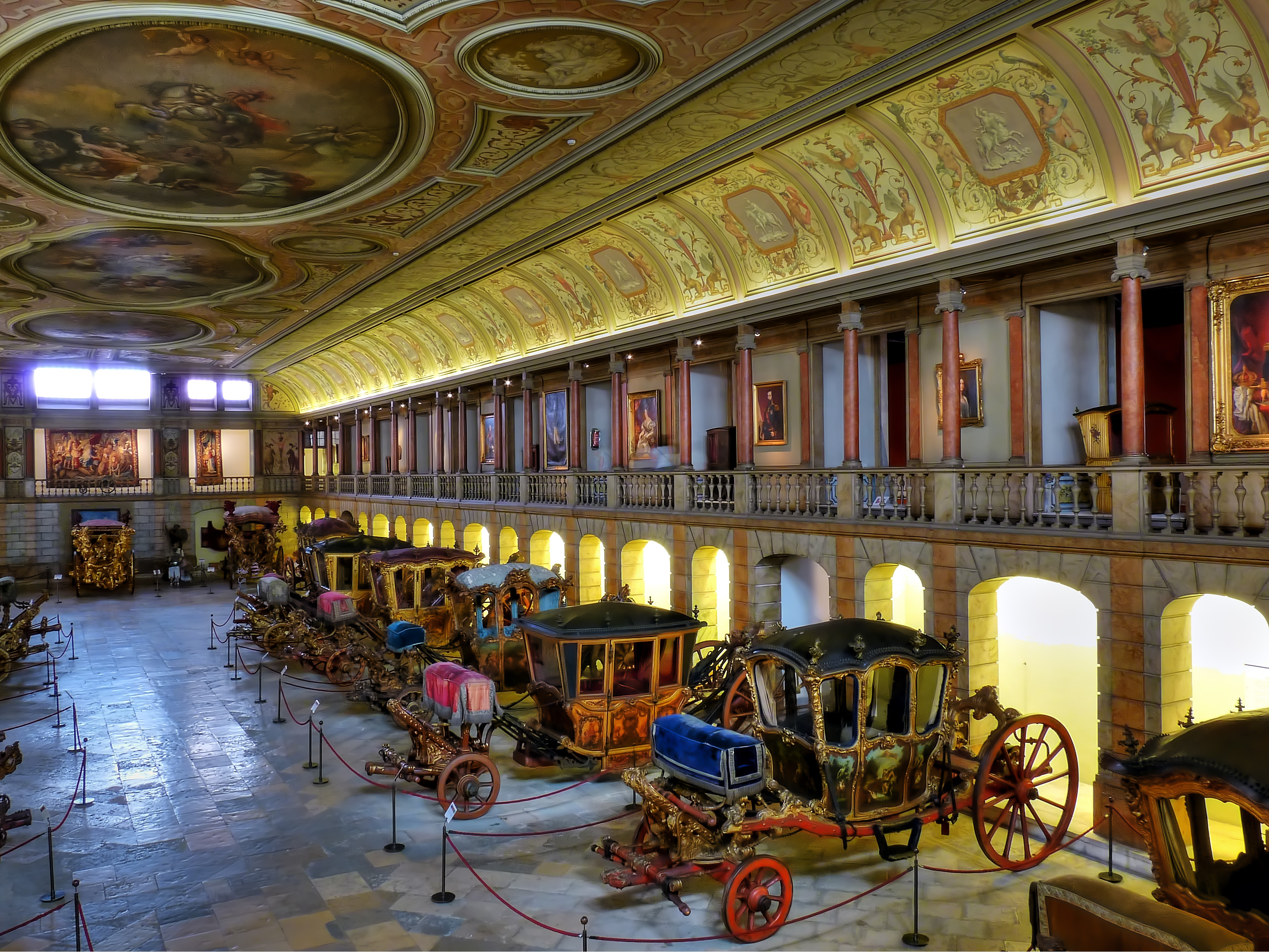
The Picadeiro Real, or Royal Riding Hall of Belém, was built in 1787.

The school's origins as an institution trace to 1726, during the reign of King João V of Portugal, as the Real Academia Equestre da Corte (Royal Equestrian Academy of the Portuguese Royal Court), which served as the riding school of the Portuguese Royal Family and the Portuguese nobility. However, prior to its formal creation, the riding school of the Portuguese Royal Family had long been one of the most respected in Europe, since the publication of the seminal "Bem Cavalgar" by King Duarte I of Portugal in 1438.

During the reign of King José I of Portugal, the 4th Marquis of Marialva served as the Estribeiro-Mor (Master of the Horse) of the royal household and the Equestrian Academy of the Court. Marialva pioneered the Portuguese tradition of equestrianism (sometimes called the Marialva Tradition or Arte Marialva) and is considered a founding father to the school and the Portuguese tradition. Likewise, his 1790 work "Luz da Liberal e Nobre Arte da Cavallaria" is considered the magnum opus of study in the school to this day.

In 1807, the Equestrian Academy of the Court was transformed into the Real Picaria Portuguesa (Royal Portuguese Riding Academy). In 1821, the school and its property nationalized and made into an institution of the state and not of the royal family. Samuel Lupi became Director of the Real Picaria Portuguesa in 1855 and later the private instructor to King Carlos I of Portugal. However, it was during the reign of King Carlos I that the Real Picaria became dormant, at the end of the 19th century.

Throughout the dormant period of the school's history, the Portuguese tradition was practiced and maintained in private equestrian academies and picadeiros. The school's history restarted in 1979, with the founding of the Escola Portuguesa da Arte Equestre as the successor institution of the Real Picaria Portuguesa.

The 4th Marquis of Marialva depicted in Luz da Liberal e Nobre Arte da Cavallaria; 1790.

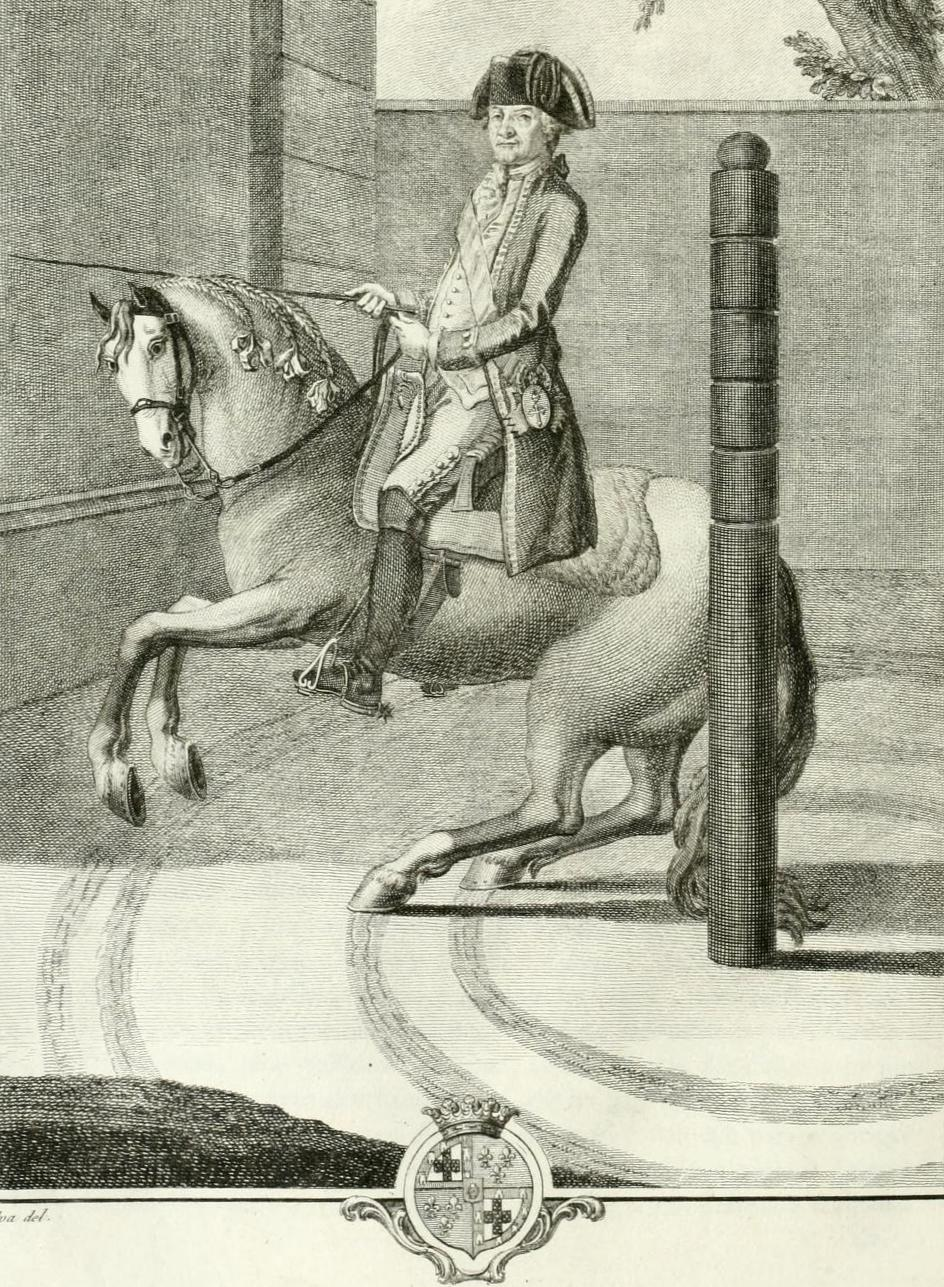
Terre à Terre (Terra à terra)

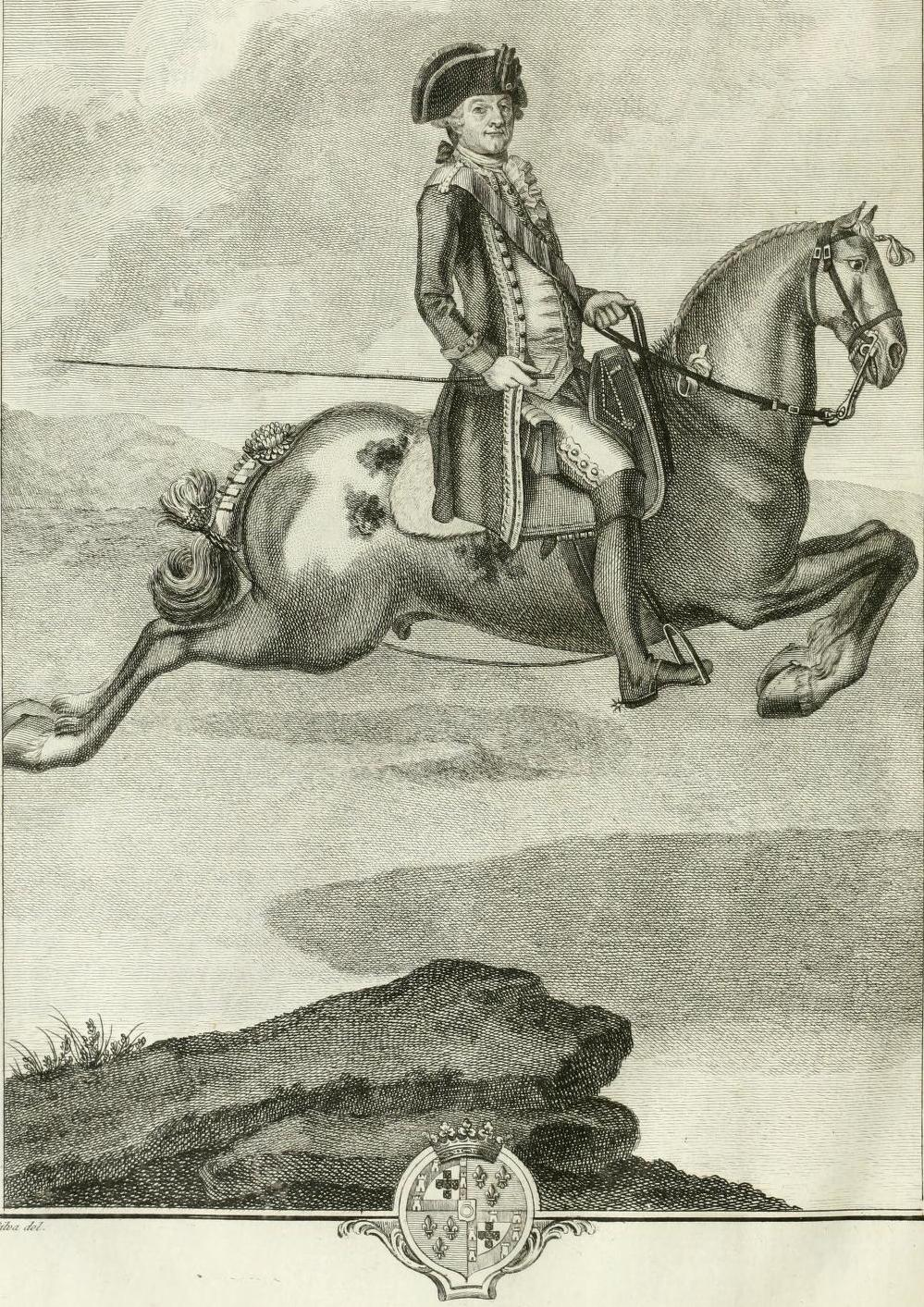
Capriole (Capriola)

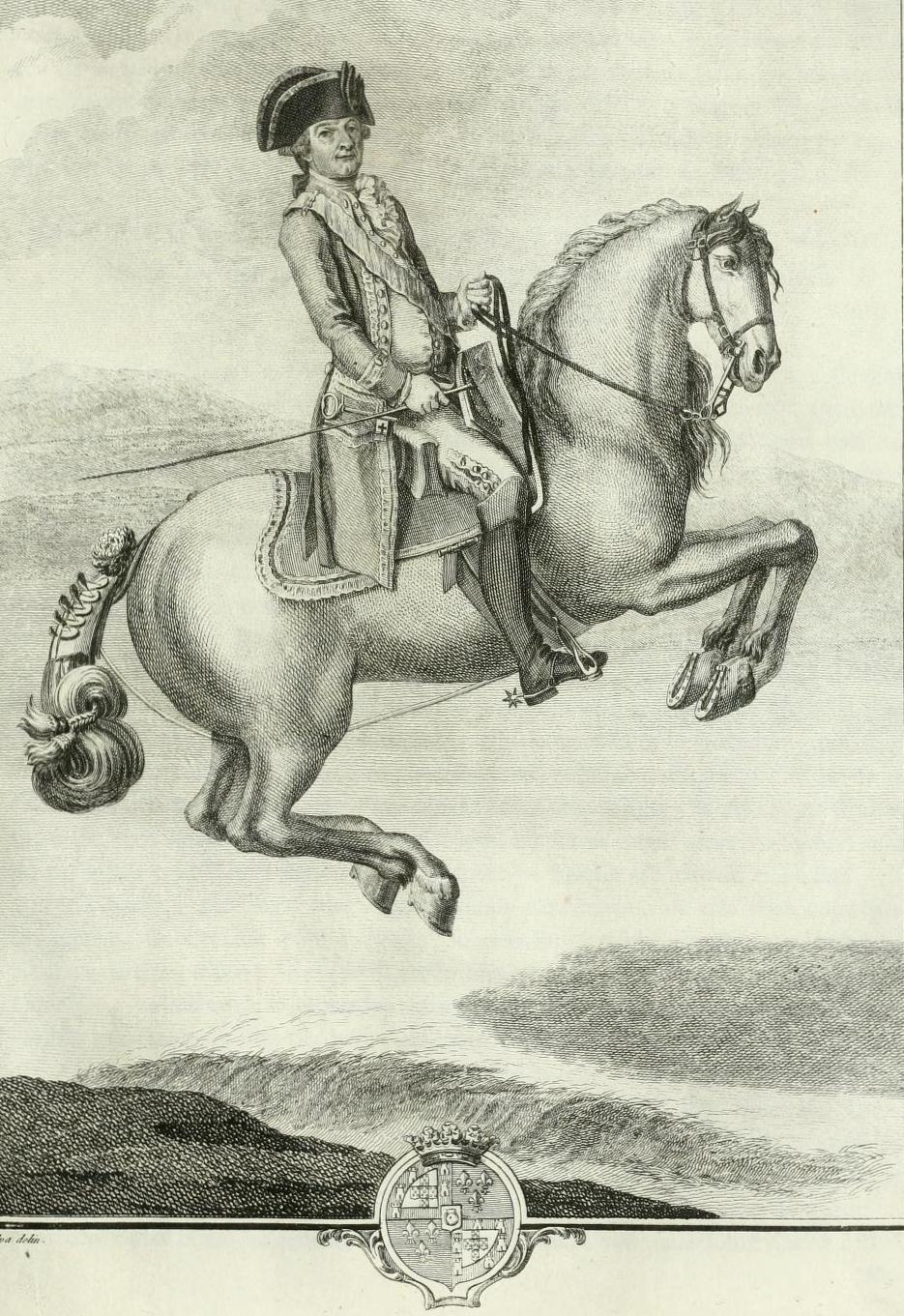
Croupade (Grupada)

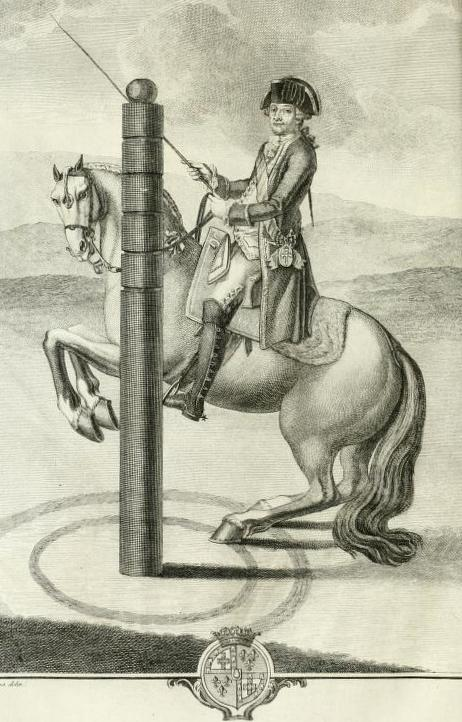
Piaffe (Pousada)

== Mission ==
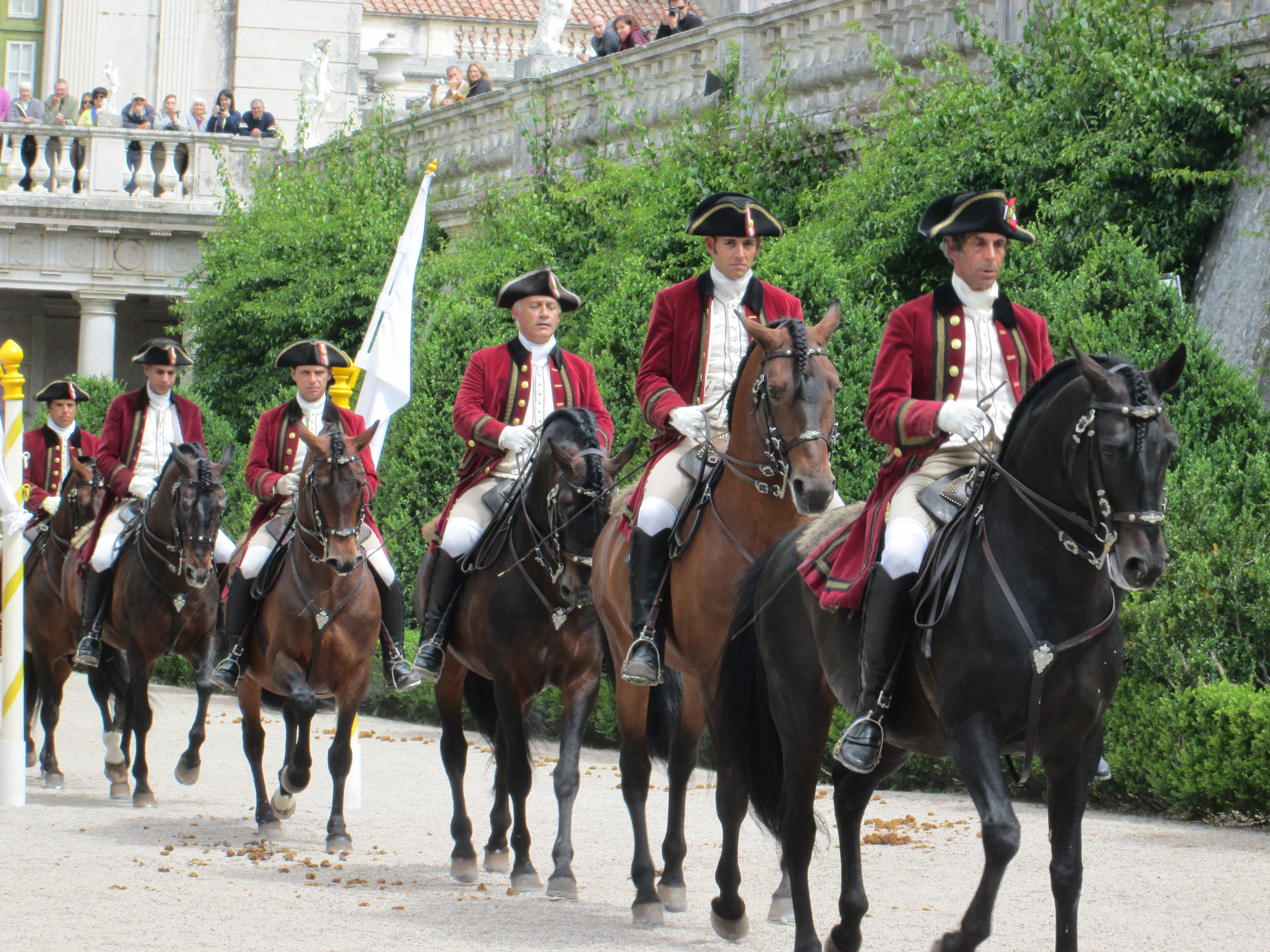
Cavaleiros in full uniform riding Lusitanos.

The primary directives of the Portuguese School of Equestrian Art are the conservation of the Lusitano horse, also known as the Pure Blood Lusitano, and the maintenance of classical Portuguese Baroque horsemanship. The Lusitano is an Iberian horse of Baroque stock famed for its prominence and strength in dressage and Portuguese-style bullfighting. It is the goal of the Portuguese School to preserve classical dressage (Haute ecole) of the Portuguese tradition.

=== Administration ===
The academy and training grounds of the Portuguese School are based at Queluz National Palace, in Sintra, on the Portuguese Riviera, outside of Lisbon. The school also maintains the Picadeiro Henrique Calado riding hall in Belém, Lisbon, originally built in 1833 for Queen Maria II of Portugal's Lancers Regiment.

The academy consists of 17 riders, called cavaleiros ("horsemen" or "knights"). The Director of the Portuguese School is Lt. Col. Paulo Candoso. The school's Mestre Picador Chefe (Chief Master Rider) is currently João Pedro Rodrigues.

=== Horses ===
The Portuguese School of Equestrian Art exclusively uses Lusitano horses bred from the Alter Real State Stud, established in 1748 by King João V of Portugal to provide horses for use by the Portuguese Royal Family and by the Royal Equestrian Academy. Lusitanos were used by the royal family for performing classical dressage and competing in the Jogos da Corte, the Royal Court Games (tournaments held between the 16th and 19th centuries to commemorate festivities).

== See also ==
- Lusitano
- Alter Real State Stud
- Spanish Riding School of Austria
- Royal Andalusian School of Equestrian Art of Spain
- Cadre Noir of France
