= Mateus Vicente de Oliveira =

Portuguese architect

The "Ceremonial Façade" of the Palace of Queluz by Mateus Vicente de Oliveira

Mateus Vicente de Oliveira (1706–1786) was a Portuguese architect. He studied under the architects João Frederico Ludovice and Jean Baptiste Robillon during the construction of the royal palace at Mafra – Portugal's attempt to rival the Spanish king's palace at Escorial.

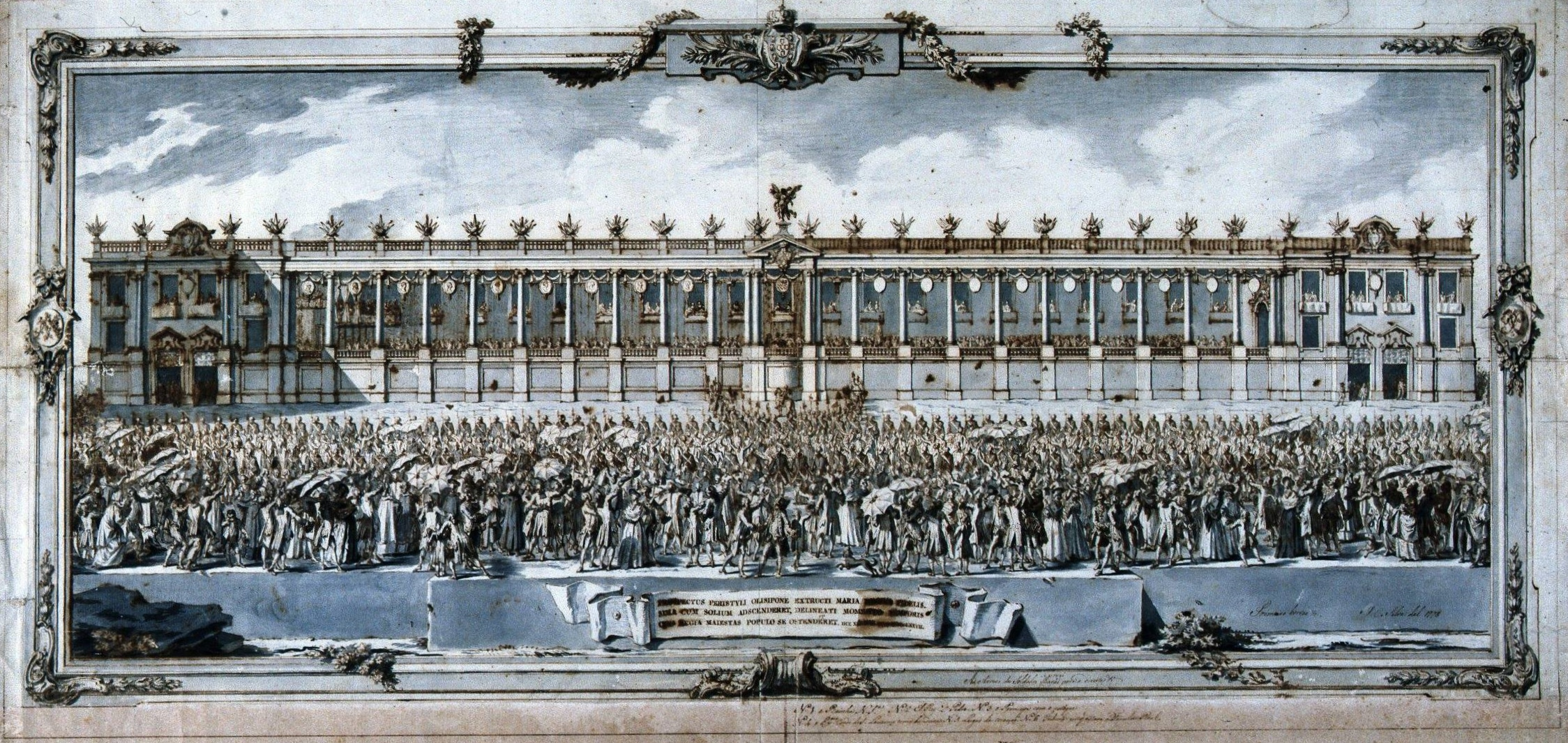
The ephemeral balcony erected by Mateus Vicente de Oliveira for the acclaiming of Queen Maria in 1777, on the western side of the Praça do Comércio in Lisbon.

Oliveira worked chiefly in the late Baroque and rococo styles of architecture. While he is best remembered for his design of the Palace of Queluz, on which he worked from 1742 to 1758, he also worked on many other projects. In 1779 he began work on the Basílica da Estrela in Lisbon; this church was incomplete at the time of de Oliveira's death and work continued under the direction of Reinaldo Manuel. While Manuel was responsible for much of the classical detail of the church's exterior, the blueprint of the church is credited to de Oliveira.
