= Palace of Queluz =

18th-century Rococo Portuguese palace in Lisbon

Coordinates: 38.7506°N 9.2587°W

The Palace of Queluz. The "Ceremonial Façade" of the corps de logis designed by Mateus Vicente de Oliveira.

The Palace of Queluz (Portuguese: Palácio de Queluz, Portuguese pronunciation: [kɛˈluʃ]) is an 18th-century palace located at Queluz, a city of the Sintra Municipality, in the Lisbon District, on the Portuguese Riviera. One of the last great Rococo buildings to be designed in Europe, the palace was conceived as a summer retreat for King Joseph I's brother, Peter of Braganza, later to become husband and king jure uxoris (as King Peter III) to his own niece, Queen Maria I. It eventually served as a discreet place of incarceration for Maria I, when she became afflicted by severe mental illness in the years following Peter III's death in 1786. Following the destruction of the Palace of Ajuda by fire in 1794, Queluz Palace became the official residence of the Portuguese Prince Regent John, and his family, and remained so until the royal family fled to the Portuguese colony of Brazil following the French invasion of Portugal (1807).

Work on the palace began in 1747 under Portuguese architect Mateus Vicente de Oliveira. Despite being far smaller, the palace is often referred to as the "Portuguese Versailles." From 1826, the palace slowly fell from favour with the Portuguese sovereigns. In 1908, it became the property of the state. Following a serious fire in 1934, which gutted one-third of the interior, the palace was extensively restored, and today is open to the public as a major tourist attraction.

One wing of the palace, called the Queen Maria I Pavilion, built by Manuel Caetano de Sousa, is currently used as Portugal's official state guest house, allocated to foreign heads of state.

== Architecture and history ==
Model of Queluz Palace

Model of Queluz Palace

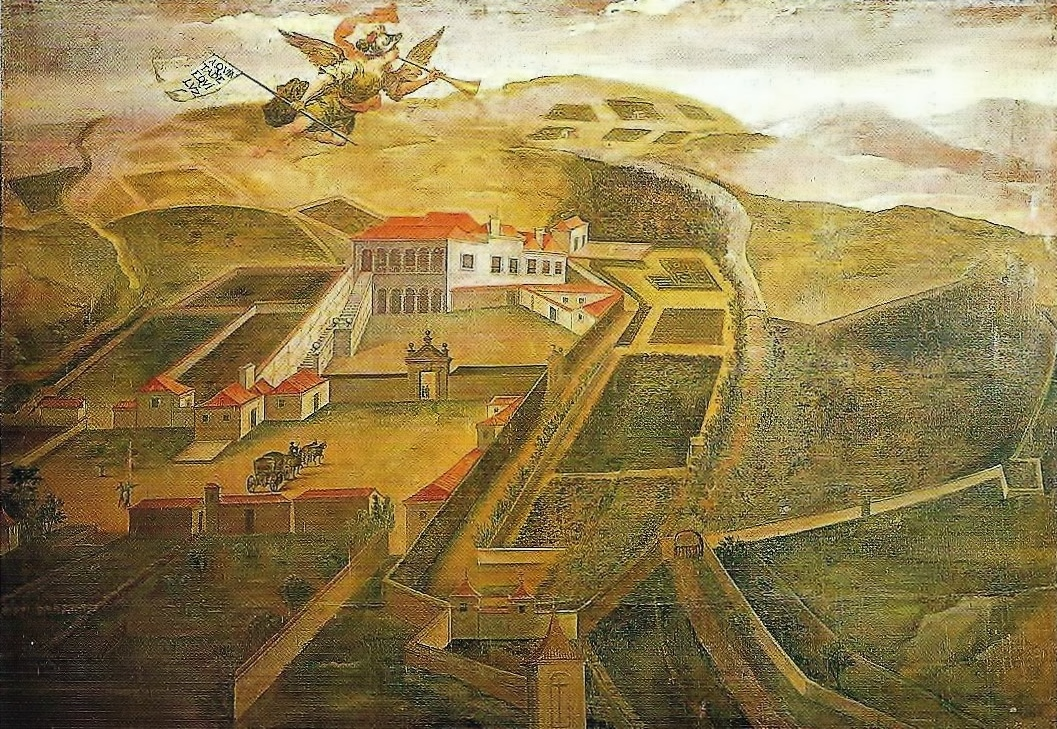
Queluz, as it looked in the 17th century

Simplified diagram showing layout of the palace (not to scale). This key is referred to throughout the article – Click on numbers for images and detail.

Queluz's architecture is representative of an extravagant period of Portuguese culture, which followed the discovery of Brazilian gold in 1690. From the beginning of the 18th century, many foreign artists and architects were employed in Portugal to satisfy the demands of the newly enriched aristocracy; they brought with them classical ideas of architecture which derived from the Renaissance. In its design, Queluz is a revolt against the earlier, heavier, Italian-influenced Baroque, which preceded the Rococo style throughout Europe.

Comparisons with the far larger, and more Baroque, Versailles are unwarranted; Versailles is referred to as having "an aura of majesty" and was built and dedicated to exhibit in stone "all the glories of France," whereas the smaller palace at Queluz has been described as "exquisite rather than magnificent" and looking like "a very expensive birthday cake". In its frivolity, the architecture of Queluz reflects the lifestyle led by the Portuguese royal family at the time of its construction; during the reign of Peter of Braganza's brother, Joseph I. At this time, Portugal was, in practice, governed by a valido—or favourite, Sebastião de Melo, Marquis of Pombal. Pombal encouraged the royal family to while away their days in the country and leave affairs of state to him. Thus, the extravagant, almost whimsical, architecture of Queluz is so set apart from that of nearby Portuguese capital, Lisbon; representing the politics and social events during this era, as well as the carefree and flamboyant lives led by its occupants. Queluz's role as a haven for those without responsibility was, however, to be short-lived.

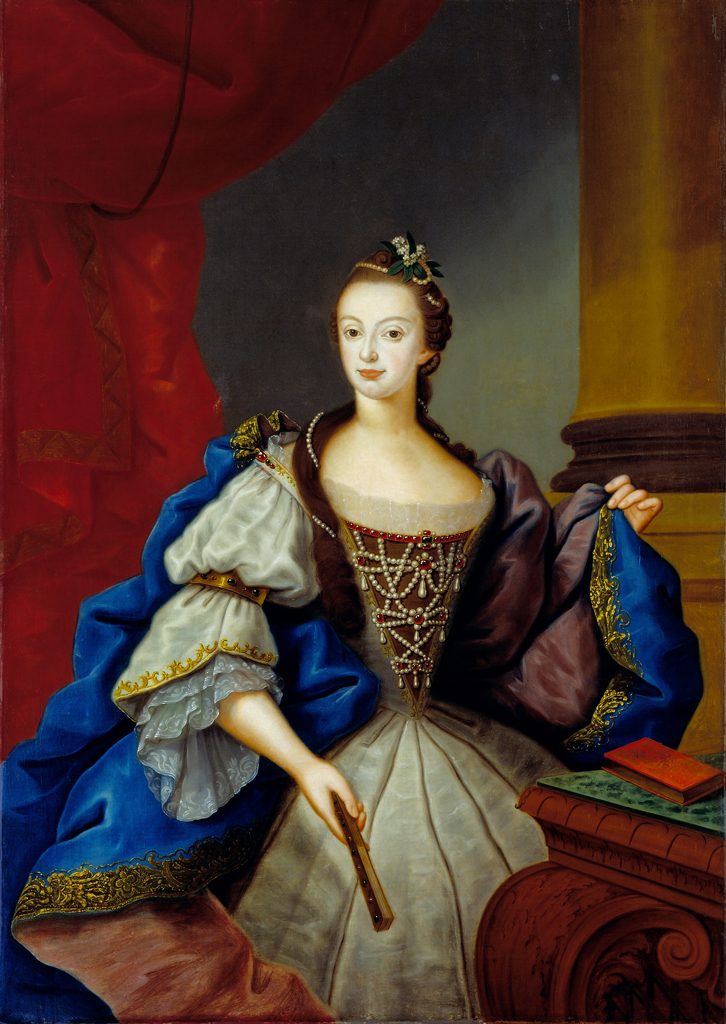
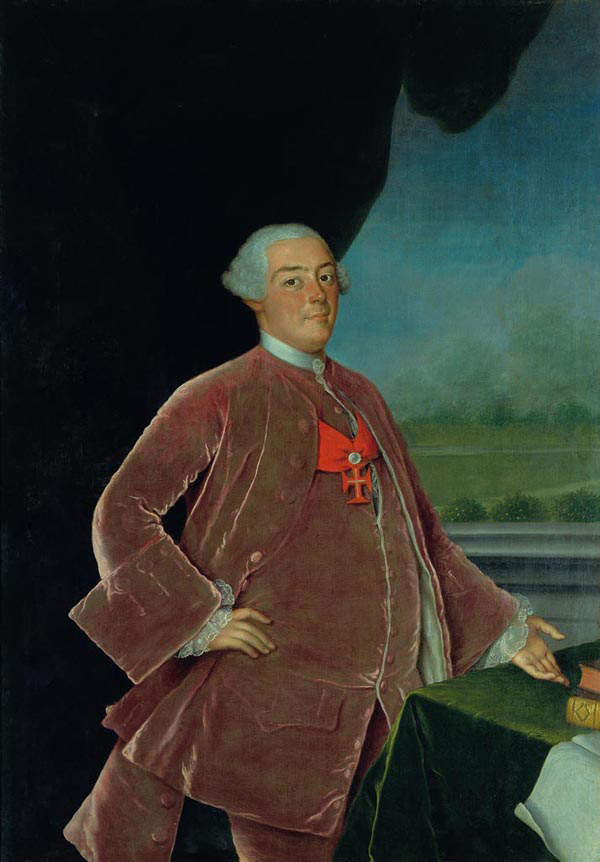
Queen Maria I and King Peter III, the founders of Queluz Palace

On the accession to the throne of Queen Maria I in 1777, Pombal was dismissed by the new Queen. She and Peter III ruled jointly in his place; using the partially completed Queluz as a retreat from affairs of state in much the same way that Frederick the Great used his own Rococo palace, Sanssouci.

The site chosen for the proposed summer retreat was in a secluded hollow. It had originally been owned by Manuel de Moura y Corte Real, 2nd Marquis of Castel Rodrigo. When the ruling Spanish were driven from Portugal in 1640, the Marquis was accused of having collaborated with the Spanish and the property was seized by the Portuguese Crown. The estate, and its hunting lodge, then became one of the many properties of the Portuguese king, John IV. He set it aside as one of the properties reserved for the second son of the reigning monarch. Thus it came into the hands of Peter of Braganza, the second son of John V.

The architect Mateus Vicente de Oliveira had trained under João Frederico Ludovice and Jean-Baptiste Robillon during the construction of the royal Palace of Mafra and its monastery. The larger, sombre, and classical Mafra does not appear to have influenced the design for Queluz, which is in a lighter, more airy style.

Work began in 1747, and continued rapidly until 1755, when it was interrupted by the 1755 Lisbon earthquake, after which the labourers were more urgently required for the reconstruction of Lisbon. However, the earthquake proved to be a catalyst, as the urban rebuilding process stimulated the development of the arts in Portugal. The subsequent architecture of Queluz was influenced by new ideas and concepts. When work recommenced in 1758, the design was altered for fear of another earthquake. Thus, later work on the palace took the form of low, long buildings that are more structurally stable than a single high block. As a result, when viewed from a distance, the palace resembles a series of long enfilades linked by higher pavilions, rather than one single construction.

== Exterior ==
The palace's public face to the town: the entrance from the cour d'honneur. Architecturally the most severe of the palace's many façades, it gives no hint of the architectural excesses beyond (see key 2).

Robillon's entrance is reached by flights of ingeniously designed steps adorned with statuary that employ forced perspective (see key 11).

The public façade of the palace faces directly onto a town square and takes the form of two low, symmetrical, quadrant wings which flank the forward-reaching wings of a small central corps de logis, thus forming a semi-circular cour d'honneur (see key 1). The southern quadrant wing is terminated by the onion domed chapel, while the northern one contains the kitchens and servants' quarters (see keys 2, 1 and 13). The only decoration on this façade comes from the simple classical pediments above the windows. The façade, which is most readily seen from the town, presents a decorous and impassive public face with one of the most architecturally severe elevations of the palace.

Oliveira was directly responsible for the "Ceremonial Façade" of the "corps de logis", the rectangular block which forms the nucleus of the palace, and some of the interior courtyards. His former tutor, the Frenchman Jean-Baptiste Robillon, was in charge of the gardens, many buildings, and the Rococo interiors. He in turn was assisted by Jean-Baptiste Pillement and other French and Portuguese artists. The "Ceremonial Façade" is the best-known view of the palace. With classical proportions, it is externally decorated by travertine rendering and delicately carved cartouches over the windows. It has been described as a "harmonious example of Portuguese Baroque". This façade with its single-storey flanking wings forms a three-sided courtyard containing the "Hanging Garden"—so called because like the Hanging Gardens of Babylon it is on a raised terrace (see key 5).

The second major part of the palace is the great western wing, known as the Robillon wing or Robillon Pavilion, which illustrates better than any other the excesses of Baroque and Rococo architecture (see key 9). Completed in 1779, it has a doric colonnade which runs the entire length of its western and southern façades, the roof of which provides a balustraded balcony accessible from the floor above (see key 10). Owing to the topography of the site, the eastern side appears as a single-storey building, with only the upper floor visible above the ground in the "Hanging Garden". The balustrade on the roof of the Robillon wing is broken by heavy segmental pediments adorned with reclining statuary figures; the balustrade itself is also adorned with flambeaux, statuary and heavy armorial trophies (see illustration below).

The Robillon wing contains an entrance to the palace reached by flights of ingeniously designed graduated steps. Their design creates an illusion of a longer and higher perspective, centred on a corner of a terrace because of exigencies of the site, and divided mid-flight so as not to lead the eye and footstep towards an angle of the colonnade beyond. The steps are adorned with elaborate statuary (see key 11). The bays of the façade are stuccoed rose-pink, contrasting with the motifs and pilasters in natural stone (see illustration).

In 1760, Pombal arranged for King Joseph I's brother, Peter of Braganza, to marry Joseph I's daughter, Maria; heiress to the throne. Pombal then encouraged the couple to live with their children in the unfinished palace at Queluz, away from the seat of government. It had been a favourite retreat of the couple and was their principal home before Maria I's accession. Further additions were made to reflect the palace's elevation from country retreat to royal palace. However, the Queen dismissed Pombal on her accession. She felt that, as a ruling monarch, she did not have time to while away her hours in the country. Peter III interfered little in affairs of state, preferring to spend his time on religious matters and hunting.

By the time of Peter III's death in 1786, all of the interior work had been completed. However, after her husband's death, the Queen's mental health began to dramatically deteriorate. By 1794, she and her court took up official, full-time residence at Queluz so that the Queen could be hidden from the view of her subjects. Her eldest son, future King John VI, was then appointed Regent and ruled in her stead from Lisbon at the Palace of Mafra.

In 2004, the World Monuments Fund began a program to restore the lead sculptures by British sculptor John Cheere, as well as some of the other features of the garden. The project is ongoing.

By an unknown architect, the façade of the ballroom wing with its ogee arch is reminiscent of Francesco Borromini. This wing with its varying rooflines and swooping pediments illustrates the palace's appearance as a series of pavilions and wings rather than one large mass (see key 6). To the left can be seen the five-stage campanile with floral finials in the town square beyond the cour d'honneur.

The south front of the Robillon wing. The Baroque extravagance is emphasized by being placed above the simpler doric colonnade (see key 8).

== Interior ==
The interior of the palace received no less attention to detail and design than the exterior. French artisans were employed to decorate the rooms, many of which are small; their walls and ceilings painted to depict allegorical and historical scenes. Polished red bricks were frequently used as flooring, to give a rustic appearance, as well as to help keep rooms cooler in hot weather. The many tall pavilions, which link the various lower wings of the palace, allow for a series of long, low rooms, broken by higher and lighter rooms. One predominant feature of the interiors are the polychrome azulejo glazed tiles, often in a chinoiserie style, with blues and yellows contrasting with muted reds. Other materials used throughout the interior include stone imported from Genoa; woods from Brazil, Denmark and Sweden; and coloured marbles imported from Italy. Many of the palace's rooms were severely damaged by fire in 1934, and much was lost.

=== The state apartments ===
==== Sala das Mangas ====
The "Sala de Mangas" decorated with tile panels illustrating the wealth of Portugal's colonies.

The Sala das Mangas (the only room in the state apartments to survive the 1934 fire intact) is a long gallery lined with tiled wall panels. The gallery leads to the enfilade of state rooms, all of which have been fully restored. The formal rooms of the palace consist of three large halls: The Sala dos Embaixadores, The Music Room, and the Ball Room. Other smaller rooms include the Gun Room (where hunting parties would assemble), which is a frescoed salon, painted with trees and foliage by Pillement.

==== The Music Room ====
The Music Room, which follows the Sala dos Embaixadores, is decorated with gilded and painted wood and was redesigned in 1768. The ceiling inset with painted cartouches is notable for the intricate, ribbed scheme of its design, similar to that of the vestibule at Caserta. The Music Room is decorated in a more neoclassical style than the other state rooms, reflecting its redesign in the period following the Baroque-Rococo in the final half of the 18th century. This room was the setting for the large concerts for which the palace was famous. The room still contains the Empire style grand piano, decorated with gilt appliqués. Above the piano, hangs a portrait of Maria I. As in many other rooms of the palace, the Music Room is lit by large crystal chandeliers.

==== The Ball Room ====
The Ball Room, the last of the palace's three largest rooms, was designed by Robillon in 1760. To create this oval room, the architect combined five smaller rooms. The ormolu Rococo ornamentation takes the form of heavy gilding on the walls and ceiling, of such richness, that it has been compared to that of François de Cuvilliés' Amalienburg at Schloss Nymphenburg. The walls and doors are mirrored, and the painted and gilded coffered ceiling is supported by golden caryatids.

==== Sala dos Embaixadores ====
The Sala dos Embaixadores (Hall of Ambassadors), sometimes called the throne room or the Hall of Mirrors, was designed by Robillon in 1757 and is one of the largest reception rooms in the palace. This long, low room has a ceiling painted by Francisco de Melo, which depicts the Portuguese royal family attending a concert during the reign of Queen Maria I. The room is extremely wide and light, spanning the full width of the palace, with tall windows on both sides. Between each window is a semi-circular gilt console table, above which are pier glasses adorned with crystal sconces. The throne dais, set in an apse, is flanked by gilded and mirrored columns, and the floor is a chequer board pattern of black and white marble tiles.

The Music Room. Portrait of Maria I hangs above the piano.

The Ballroom. Robillon's Rococo ornament is comparable with that of the Amalienburg at Schloss Nymphenburg.

The Hall of Ambassadors.

==== The Chapel ====
During the occupancy of the palace by Queen Maria I and King Peter III, the chapel was central to the daily routine of their court. It was no coincidence that the chapel was the first part of the palace to be completed and was consecrated as early as 1752. Religion was one of Peter III's favourite interests. During the reign of his wife, he attended to matters spiritual and she to matters temporal. The Queen's interest in religion was, however, no less fevered than that of her husband and the couple attended mass several times a day.

Following Peter III's death, the Queen abandoned all festivities at the palace and state receptions assumed the air of religious ceremonies. The Queen's mental illness became severe and her religious fervor increased. Queluz and its chapel then became her permanent retreat from the world, until she was forced to flee from the advancing French in 1807 to Brazil, where she remained until her death in Rio de Janeiro in 1816.

The chapel beneath its large onion dome is dark, cavernous, and decorated in carved giltwood, with its detailing highlighted in red, green, blue and pink; created by Portuguese sculptor Silvestre Faria Lobo. The upper level has galleries for use by royal personages, who sat apart from the congregation. One of these galleries contains a small Rococo pipe organ. A feature of the chapel is the ornate, portable font; its marble basin resting in an elaborate Rococo frame, surmounted by a carved wood cover.

Chapel altar

Chapel ceiling

=== Private apartments ===
The private rooms of the palace are far smaller, and more intimate, than the formal state rooms and contain many royal mementos and curios which belonged to the rooms' former occupants. Among the more remarkable rooms in this suite are the Sala das Merendas, the Queen's Boudoir, and the King's Bedroom.

==== Sala das Merendas ====
This was the royal family's private dining room. The decoration continues the theme used in some of the more formal and public rooms, with tiled panels illustrating courtiers in sylvan poses. These panels, like much other work in the palace, were produced by João Valentim and José Conrado Rosa.

==== The Queen's Boudoir ====
This was one of the private rooms used by Maria I during her time at Queluz. It is designed in the form of a bower, with a trellis pattern on the ceiling, which is reflected in the design of the marquetry floor, giving the impression of being in a pergola rather than an interior. The marquetry floors of the private rooms distinguish these smaller, more intimate, rooms from the larger state rooms where such delicate features would have been damaged by more frequent use. The walls of the boudoir are heavily mirrored and contain overdoor and mirror cartouches by José Conrado Rosa. Next to the boudoir is the Queen's bedroom; it was from this light and airy room that the shrieks of the mentally ill Queen were reported by William Beckford, while visiting the palace in 1794.

==== The King's Bedroom ====
The King's Bedroom has been described as one of the most "fantastic" rooms in the palace. Although actually square, it gives the illusion of being completely circular, with a domed ceiling supported by columns of mirrored glass. Between the columns are cartouches depicting scenes from the tales of Don Quixote. King Peter IV died in this room in 1834; the same room where he had been born in 1798. The room contains a large bust of the King showing his "pendulous jowls and unattractive face".

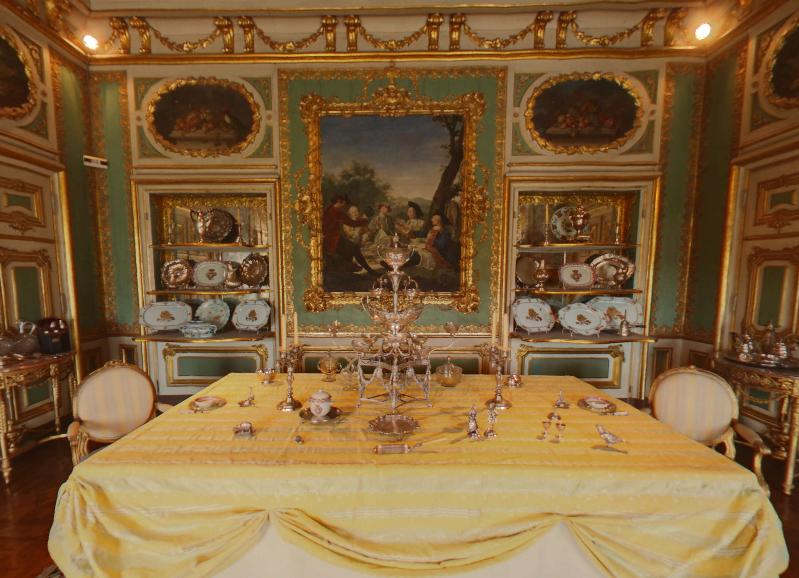
The Sala das Merendas

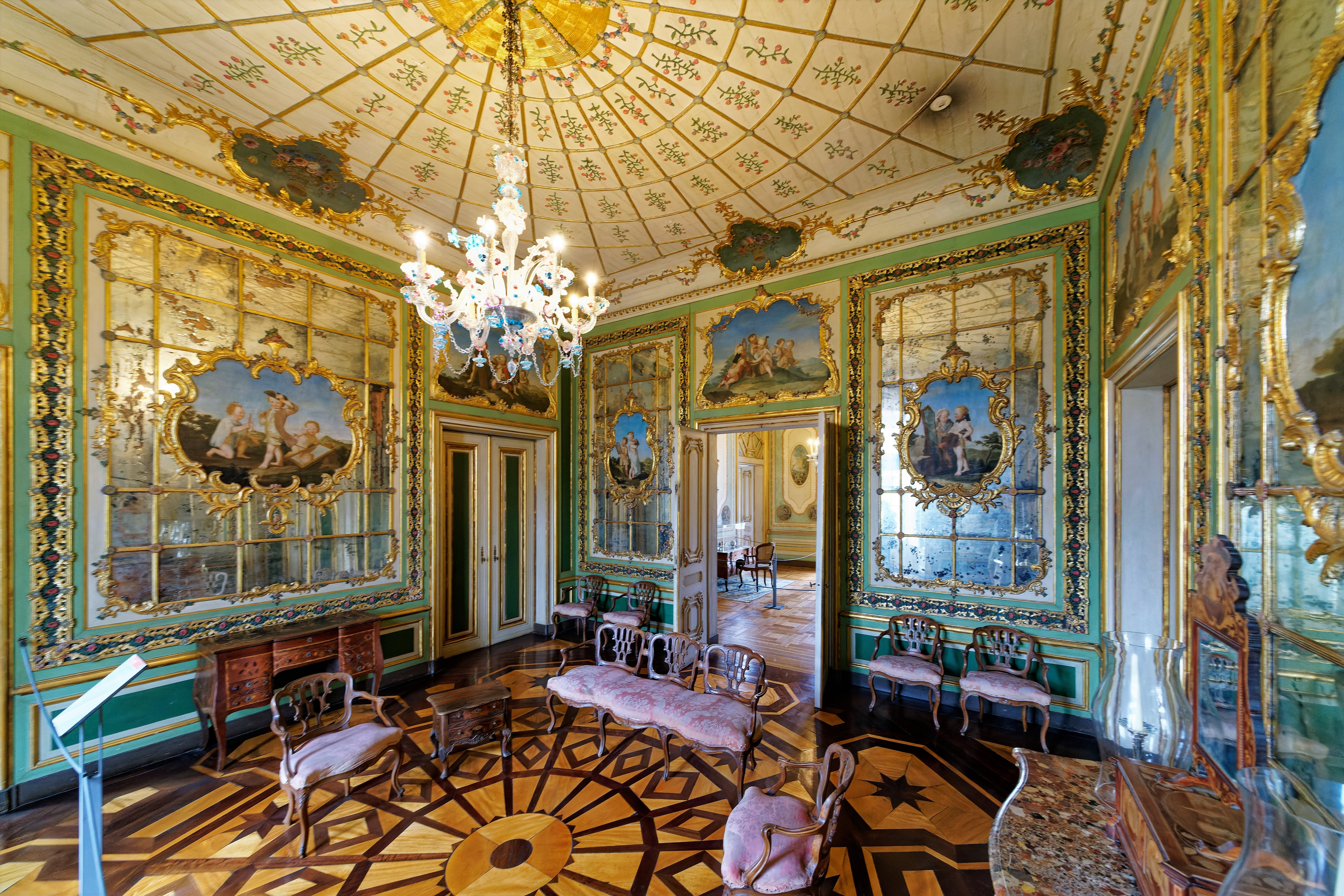
The Queen's Boudoir. The trellis design in the marquetry floor matches the pergola design painted on the ceiling above.

Domed ceiling decorated with floral patterns and a crystal chandelier in The Queen's Boudoir.

The King's Bedroom. This circular room with a domed ceiling has walls decorated with scenes from Don Quixote.

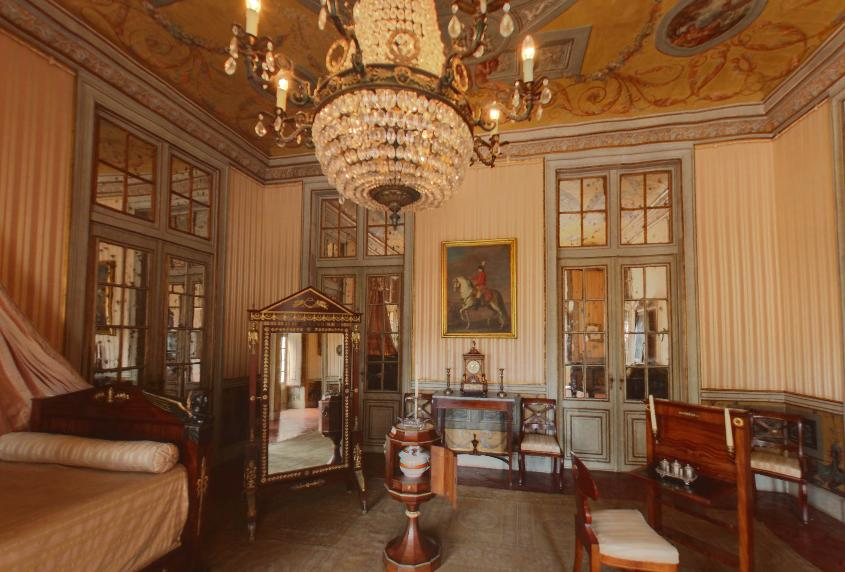
The Empire Bedroom

== Grounds ==
Queluz is famed for the glory of its gardens, which include a large topiary parterre laid out in the manner of André Le Nôtre at the rear of the palace (see key 14). The Flemish influences, including the canals, in the garden are the work of the Dutch gardener Gerald van der Kolk, who assisted Robillon from 1760. Formal terraces and walkways are given extra interest by statuary and fountains. The dominant feature of the principal parterre is the Portico dos Cavalinhos, a garden temple flanked by two allegorical equestrian statues depicting Fames and two sphinxes surreally dressed in 18th-century costume—combining the formal and the fantastic. This surreal theme continues elsewhere in the gardens where such motifs as the rape of the Sabines and the death of Abel alternate with statuary of donkeys dressed in human clothing. Deeper in the gardens is a grotto complete with a cascade. Later to be a popular feature in Portuguese gardens, the Queluz cascade was the first artificial waterfall to be constructed near Lisbon.

An avenue of huge magnolias forms the approach to the classical Robillon wing of the palace (see key 7) while, from the wing, a double staircase leads to the canal. More than 100 metres (330 ft) long, the walls of the canal are decorated with tiled panels depicting seascapes and associated scenes. This is the largest of a series of canals in the gardens bordered with chinoiserie-style azulejo tiles. Fed by a stream, the sluice gates to the canals are only opened in May. During the 18th century, the canals were the setting for fêtes champêtres, during which fully rigged ships would sail in processions with figures aboard in allegorical costumes.

The gardens also contain a fountain with tritons and dolphins which has been attributed to Bernini. There are further fountains and statuary in the lower gardens, including an important collection of statues by the British sculptor John Cheere (1709–1787). These gardens are set within tall hedges of yew and cypress, as well as magnolia and mulberry trees planted by Jean-Andoche Junot during the French occupation in the Napoleonic Wars.

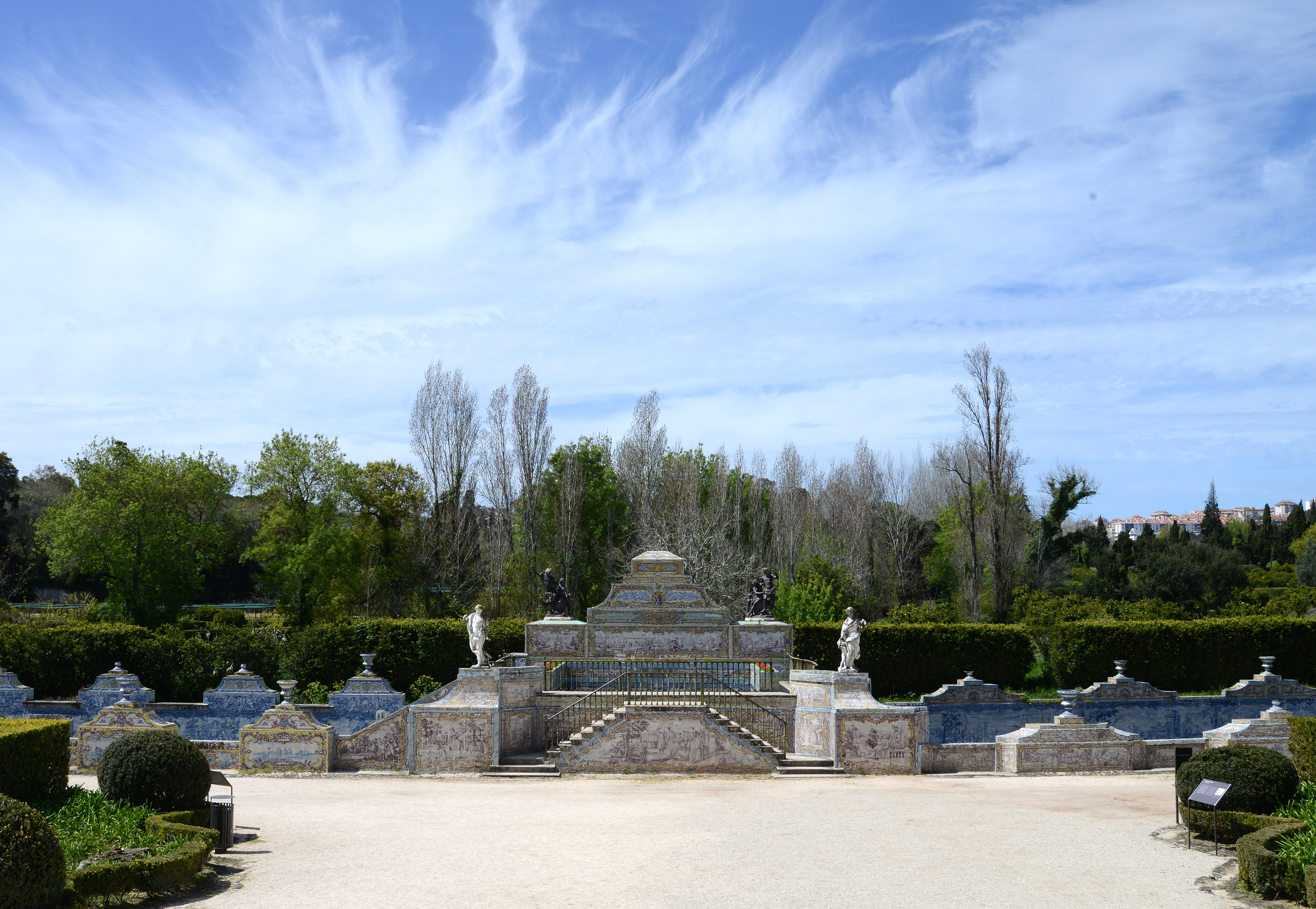
Canal dos Azulejos (Channel of the Tiles) in the Gardens of the Palace

The tiled cascade and sluice structure

A long stone-paved canal flanked by walls decorated

== Later history ==
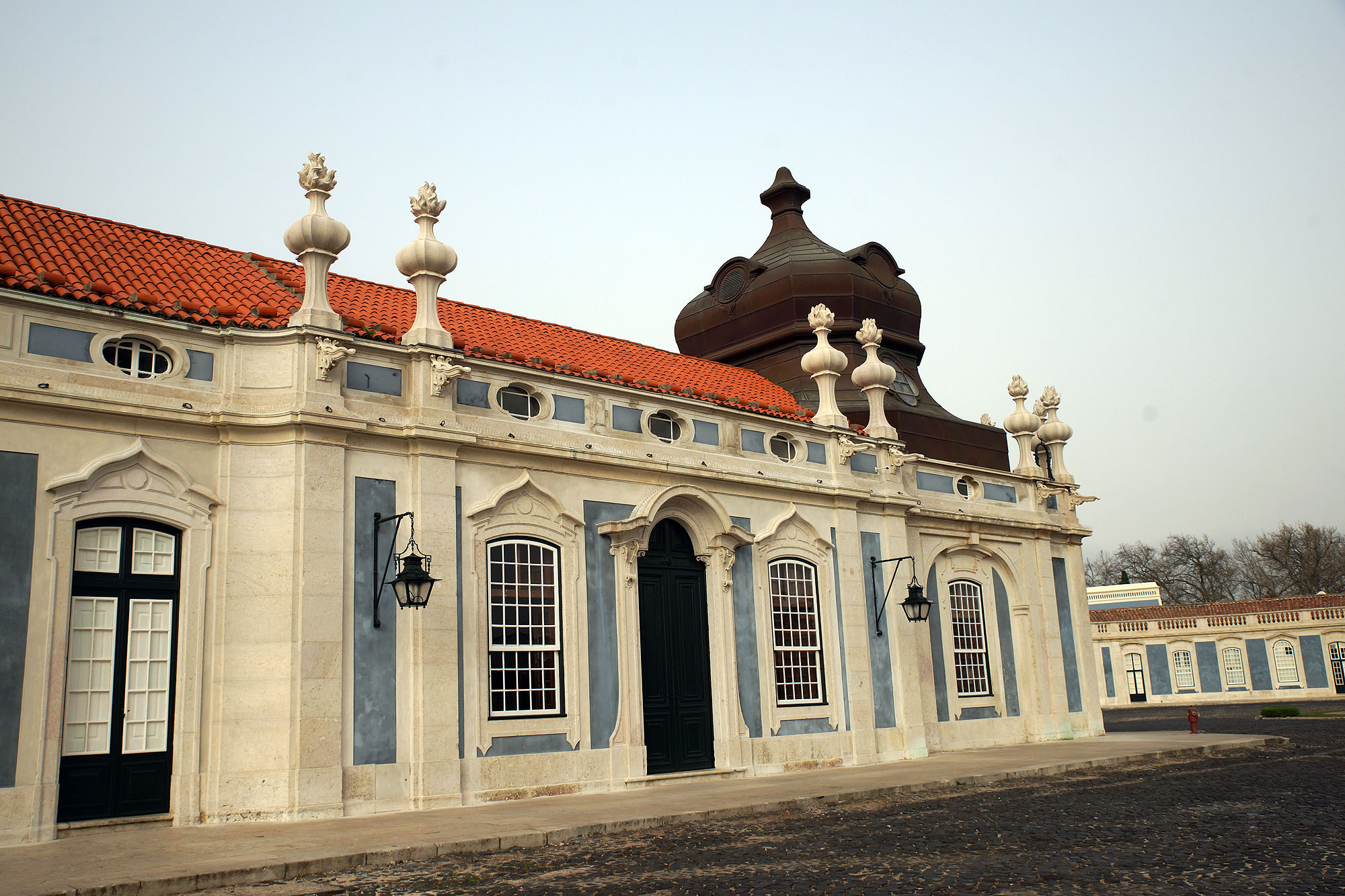
The onion dome of the chapel. This was the first part of the palace to be completed. One of the two quadrant wings of the cour d'honneur can be seen to the right. A main road passes within metres of the palace (see key 15).

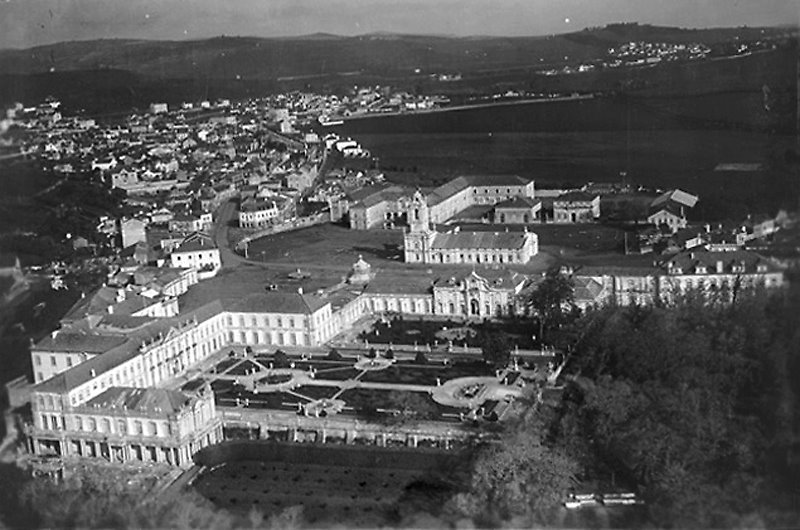
The Queluz palace in the 1920s still having the additions which were destroyed in 1934

Following a fire at the Palace of Ajuda in 1794, the Prince Regent John and his wife Carlota Joaquina of Spain began to use Queluz themselves. The Robillon wing was enlarged and given an upper floor for the use of the princess and her nine children. These additions were destroyed in the fire of 1934.

To escape the forces of Napoleon I in 1807, the Portuguese royal family abandoned Queluz and fled to Brazil. The French occupational forces took control of the palace and their commander, Jean-Andoche Junot, made several alterations to the building. On the royal family's return from exile in 1821, King John VI preferred to live at the Palace of Mafra, leaving his wife, Queen Carlota Joaquina, to occupy Queluz with her aunt Princess Maria Francisca Benedita. The King visited Queluz infrequently. However, it was on one of these rare visits that John VI died in the circular domed King's Bedroom in 1826.

Carlota Joaquina, sometimes described as sinister, is said to have been ambitious and violent. Her features were reportedly unattractive, and she was short in stature. However, she lived in great style at Queluz, employing an orchestra there which William Beckford described as the finest in Europe. The Queen also had a small private theatre in the gardens, of which nothing remains today. She died at the palace in 1830.

Following the death of Carlota Joaquina, Queluz saw only intermittent use as a royal residence and was not again the primary residence of Portuguese royalty. John VI and Carlota Joaquina's son King Miguel I used the palace during the three-year civil war he waged against his eldest brother and the former King Peter IV, who was now the reigning Emperor Peter I of Brazil, over the matter of the Portuguese succession before then being forced by Peter IV to abdicate and go into exile in 1834. A year later, Peter IV died of tuberculosis at the age of 35 at Queluz, the place of his birth. Peter IV's daughter Maria II ruled until her death in 1853 and was succeeded by her son Peter V. Following Peter V's untimely death during the cholera epidemic of 1861, the throne passed to his brother Luís I. From this time on, the royal family lived chiefly at the rebuilt Ajuda Palace in Lisbon and Pena Palace in Sintra, whereupon Queluz became disused. Upon the assassination of Luís' son Carlos I in 1908, the palace passed into the ownership of the state. Portugal was in the turmoil of revolution and the monarchy fell two years later.

== National Monument ==
In the 21st century, the palace gardens, once an irrigated oasis in the centre of parched farmland, are bounded by the Radial de Sintra motorway which feeds traffic towards Lisbon and away from Sintra. However, transportation and tourism have been important infrastructural catalysts for the palace's maintenance and management.

Since 1940, it has been open to the public as a museum. It houses much of the former royal collection, including furniture, Arraiolos carpets, paintings, and Chinese and European ceramics and porcelain.

The town square that the palace faces, Largo do Palácio de Queluz, remains relatively unaltered since the 18th century. The large houses, once the homes of courtiers, and the former Royal Guard quarters with its campanile are still clustered around the palace.

In latter years, the town of Queluz has expanded considerably to become one of the suburbs of Lisbon. The Palace of Queluz is one of the most notable public landmarks in the Lisbon metropolitan area.

== State guest house ==
The Pavilhão de D. Maria I (Queen Maria I Pavilion), which makes up the palace's southernmost wing, was built during the third, and final, construction phase, executed by Manuel Caetano de Sousa, which lasted from 1786—the year of King Peter III's death—until 1792.

In 1957, the Queen Maria I Pavilion was renovated to serve as the Portuguese Government's official state guest house, for visiting heads of state and government. The planned state tour of Queen Elizabeth II in 1957 was a principal motivating factor in the pavilion's renovation into a state guest house.

Today, the pavilion continues to house visiting dignitaries. Therefore, its state rooms are only open to the public during pre-booked tours.

== Gallery ==
Malta Garden

Malta Garden

Neptune's Lake

Neptune's Lake

Nereids' Lake

Fountain of Neptune by Ercole Ferrata

Pond in the Botanical Garden

Grand Cascade

== See also ==
- List of Baroque residences
- Pousada de Dona Maria, Queluz
- Escola Portuguesa de Arte Equestre
- Rococo in Portugal
