= List of palaces in Portugal =

List of palaces located in Portugal

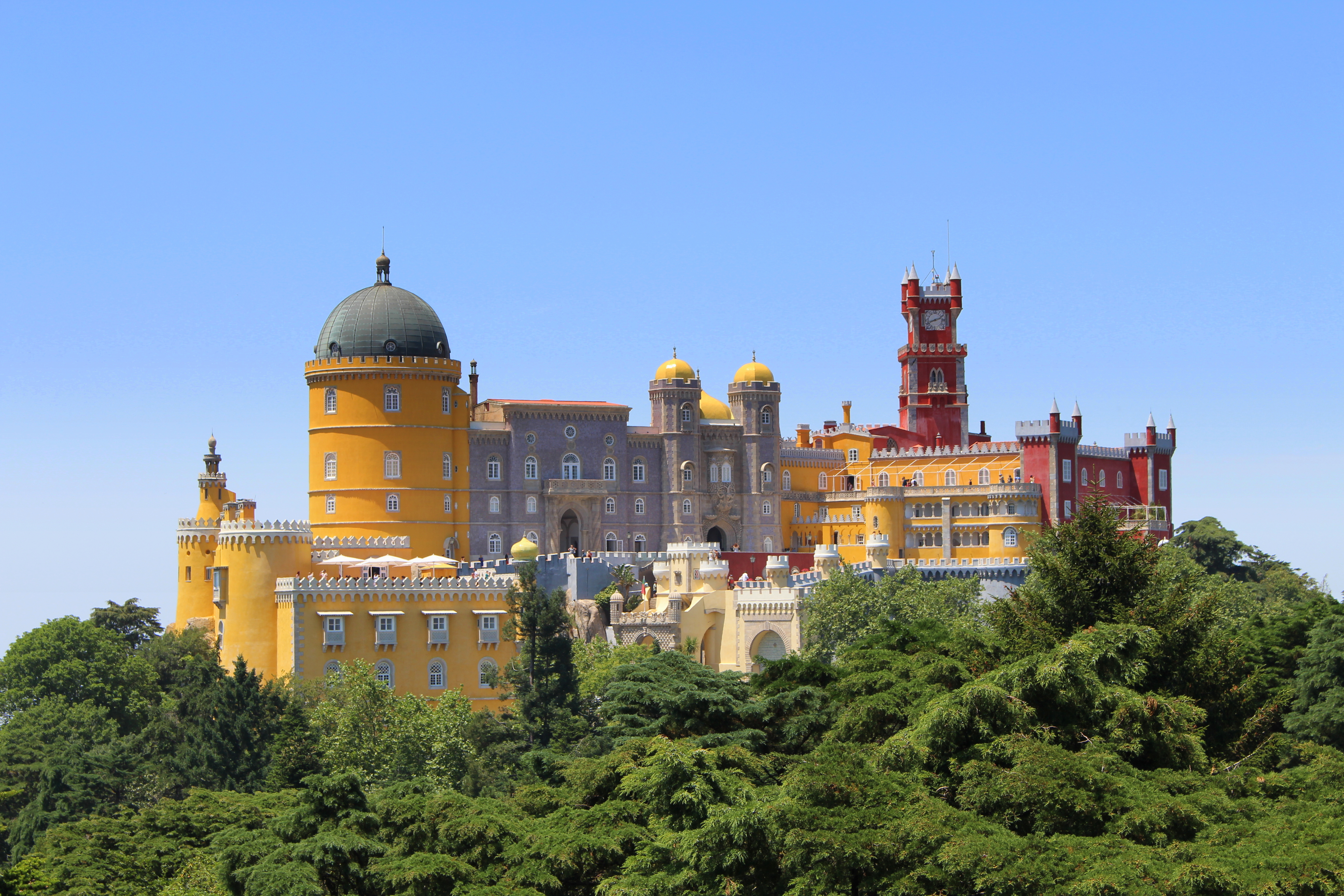
Pena National Palace

There are many palaces throughout Portugal. The list is incomplete.

== Alentejo ==
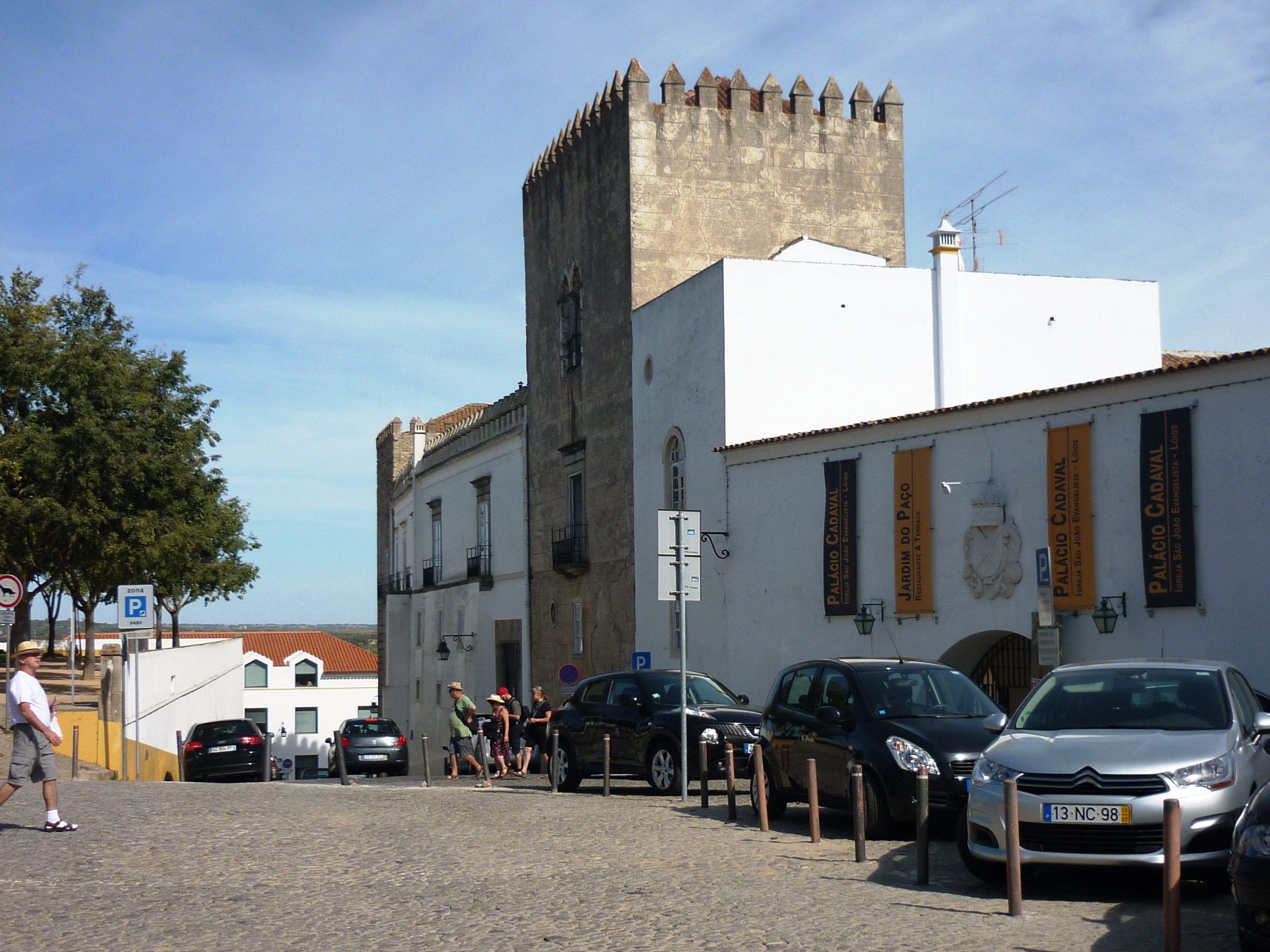
Palace of the Dukes of Cadaval

- Ducal Palace of Vila Viçosa
- Palace of the Dukes of Cadaval (Évora)

== Beira ==
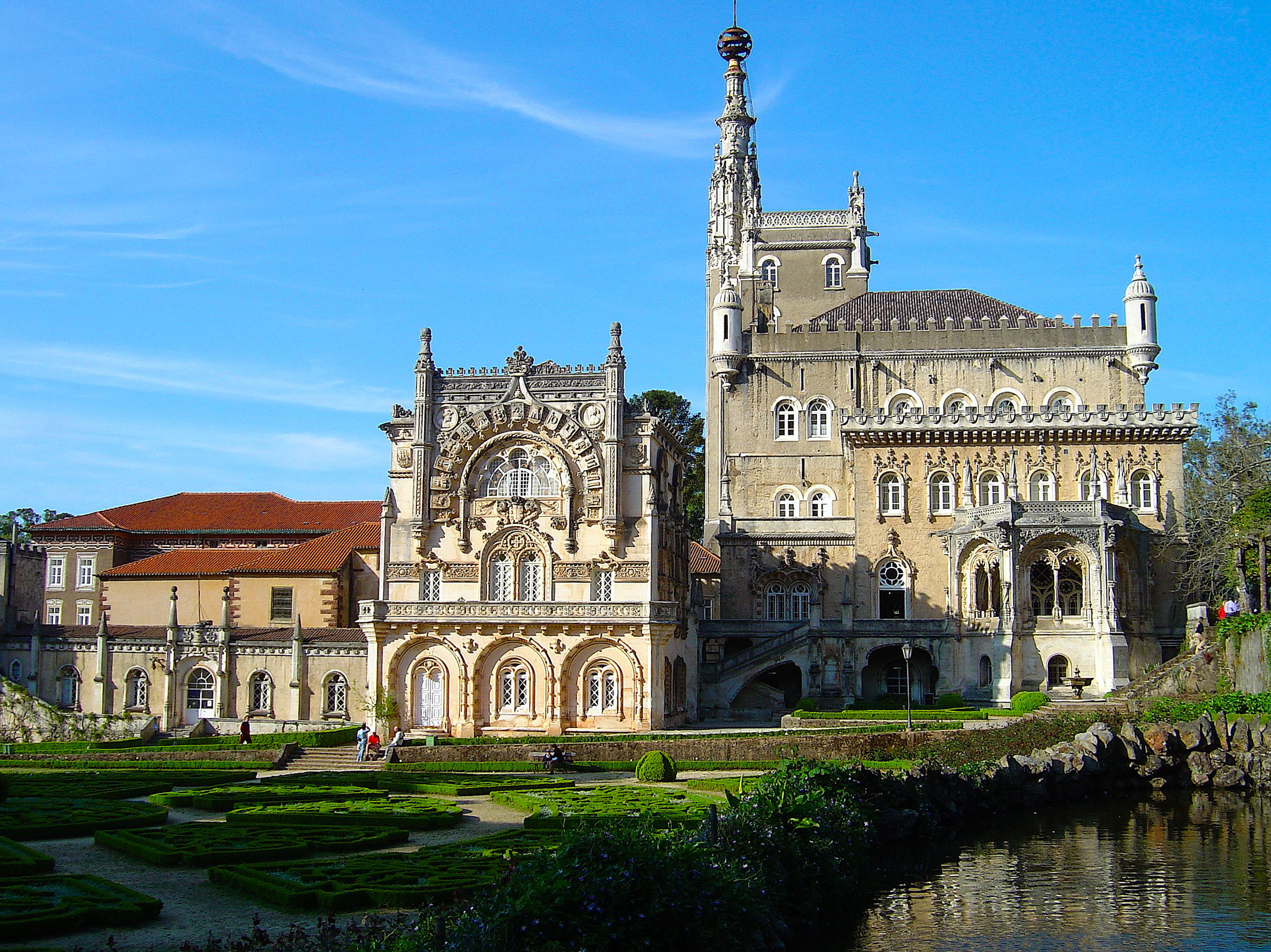
Buçaco Palace

- Paço de Sobre-Ribas
- Solar dos Cancelos
- Solar do Visconde de Almendra
- Palácio de Reriz
- Buçaco Palace
- Palácio dos Figueiredos
- Palácio Sotto Maior
- Palácio do Conselheiro Branco
- Palácio da Lousã
- Palácio Landal

== Douro Litoral ==
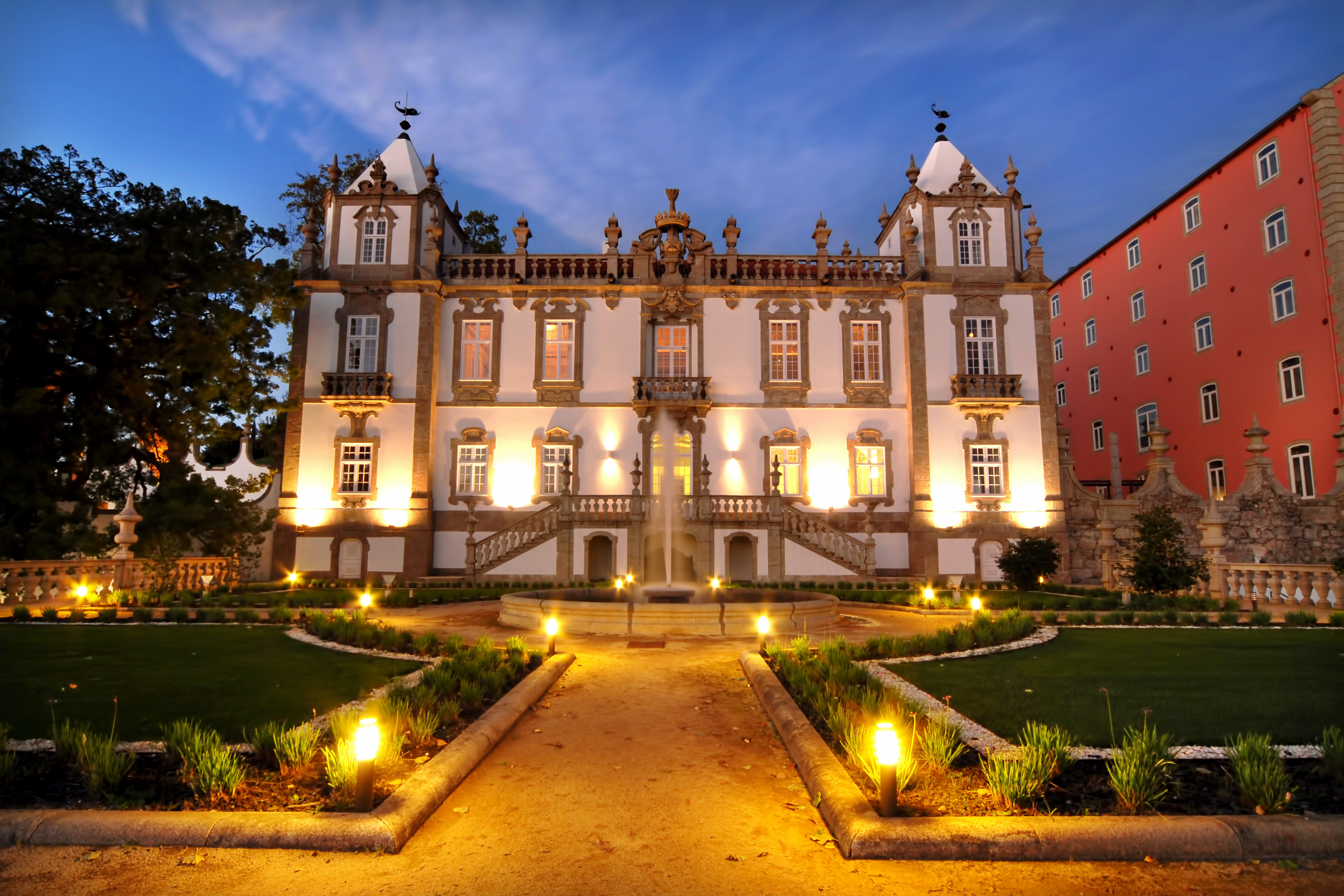
Palácio do Freixo.

- Palacete de Belomonte
- Palácio da Bolsa
- Palácio das Cardosas
- Palácio dos Carrancas
- Palácio do Bolhão
- Palácio do Freixo
- Episcopal Palace of Porto
- Palacete Pinto Leite
- Palácio de São Bento da Vitória
- Palácio de São João Novo
- Palácio dos Terenas
- Palacete dos Viscondes de Balsemão

== Minho ==
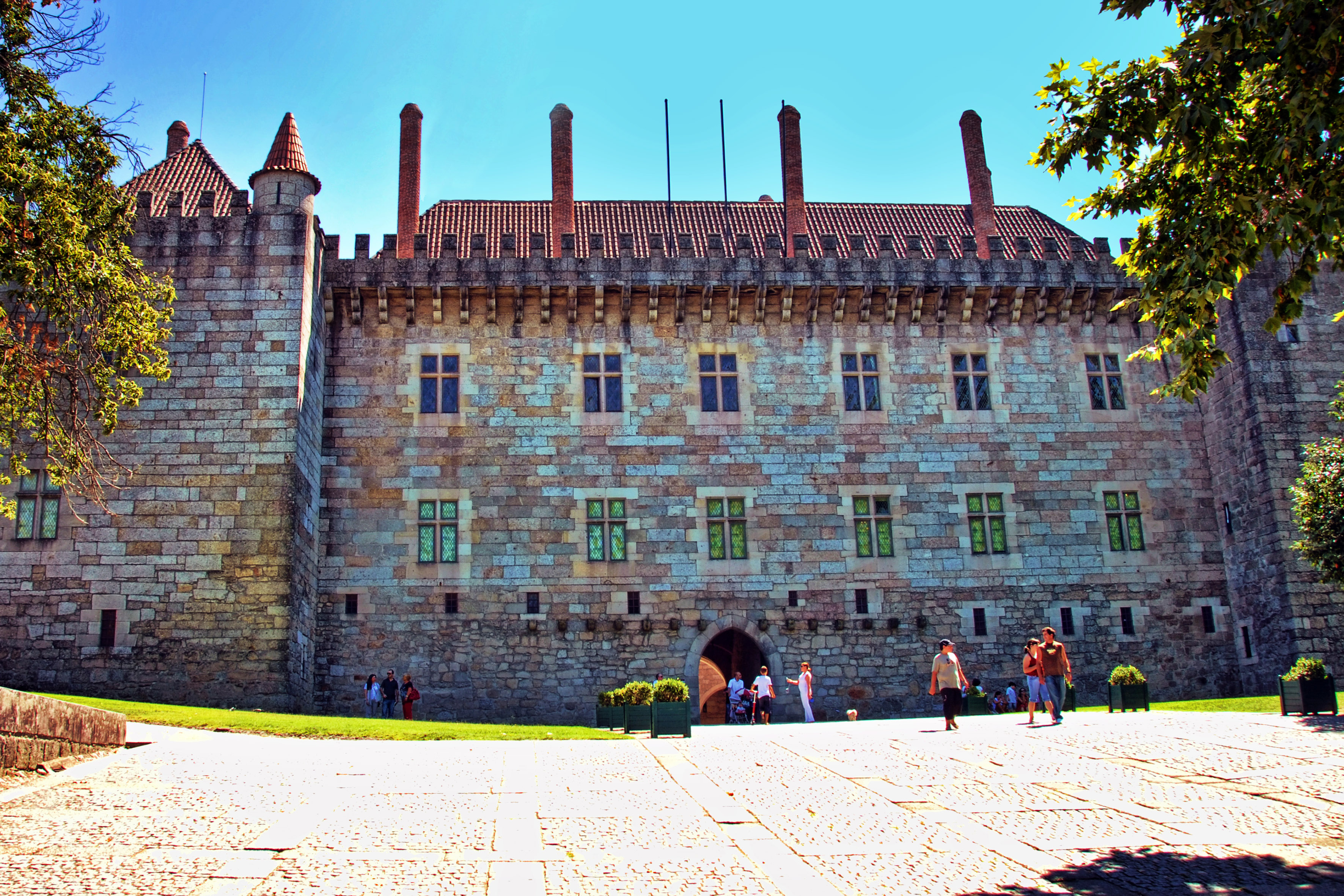
Palace of the Dukes of Braganza.

- Episcopal Palace of Braga
- Paço de Lanheses
- Castle of D. Chica
- Biscainhos Museum
- Palace of the Dukes of Braganza
- Paço de São Cipriano
- Vila Flor Palace
- Palácio Igreja Velha

== Estremadura ==
Ajuda National Palace.

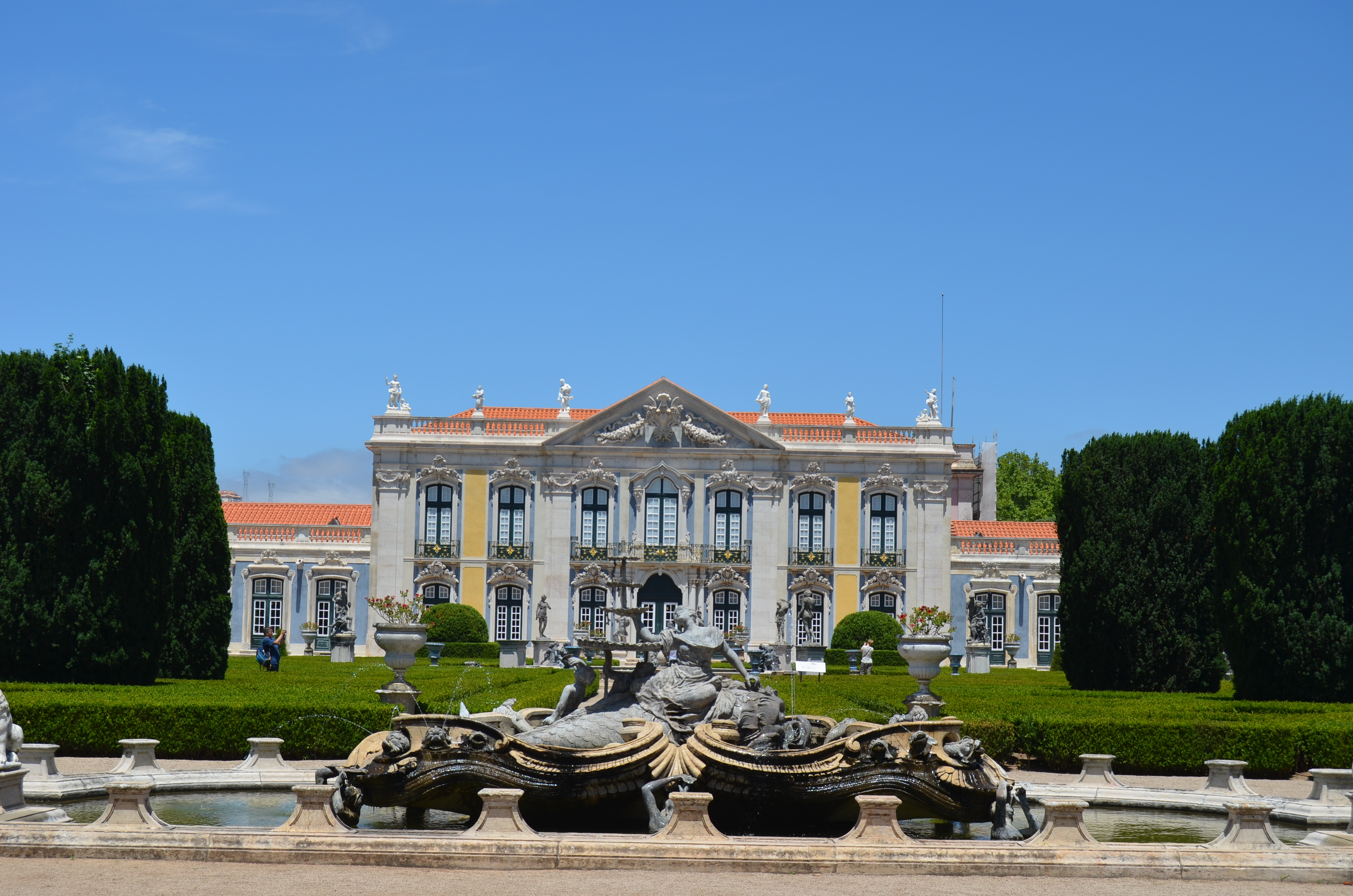
Queluz National Palace.

- Ajuda National Palace – former royal palace
- Beau-Séjour Palace
- Belém Palace – former royal palace; seat of the president of Portugal
- Bemposta Palace – former royal palace
- Burnay Palace
- Correio-Mor Palace – former seat of the High-Couriers of the Kingdom
- Estaus Palace
- Feu Guião Palace
- Galveias Palace
- Mafra National Palace – former royal palace
- Monserrate Palace
- Palace of Necessidades – former royal palace; seat of the Ministry of Foreign Affairs (Portugal)
- Palace of the Counts of Azambuja
- Palace of the Counts of Penafiel
- Palace of the Counts of Redondo
- Palácio dos Condes da Calheta
- Palace of the Dukes of Palmela
- Palace of the Marquesses of Fronteira
- Pena National Palace – former royal palace
- Pimenta Palace
- Queluz National Palace – former royal palace
- Ribeira Palace – former royal palace
- Sant'Anna palace
- São Bento Palace – seat of Portuguese Parliament
- Seteais Palace
- Sintra National Palace – former royal palace
- Sotto Mayor Palace
- Verride Palace
- Palácio dos Condes de Castro Guimarães
- Palácio Ludovice
- Palácio da Rosa
- Quinta da Regaleira
- Palácio da Bacalhoa

== Trás-os-Montes e Alto Douro ==
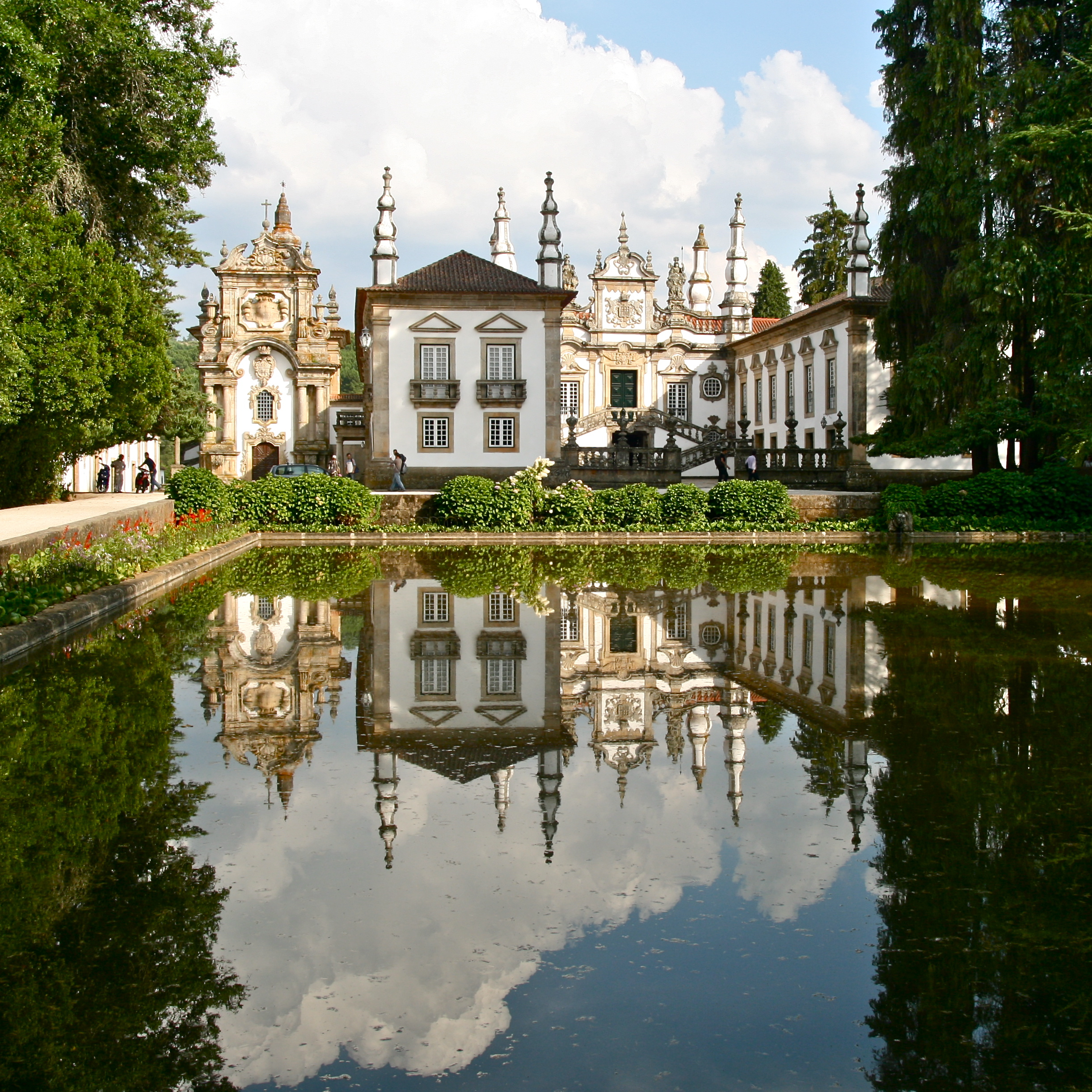
Mateus Palace.

- Palácio dos Pimentéis
- Mateus Palace
- Paço dos Távoras

== Azores and Madeira Archipelagos ==
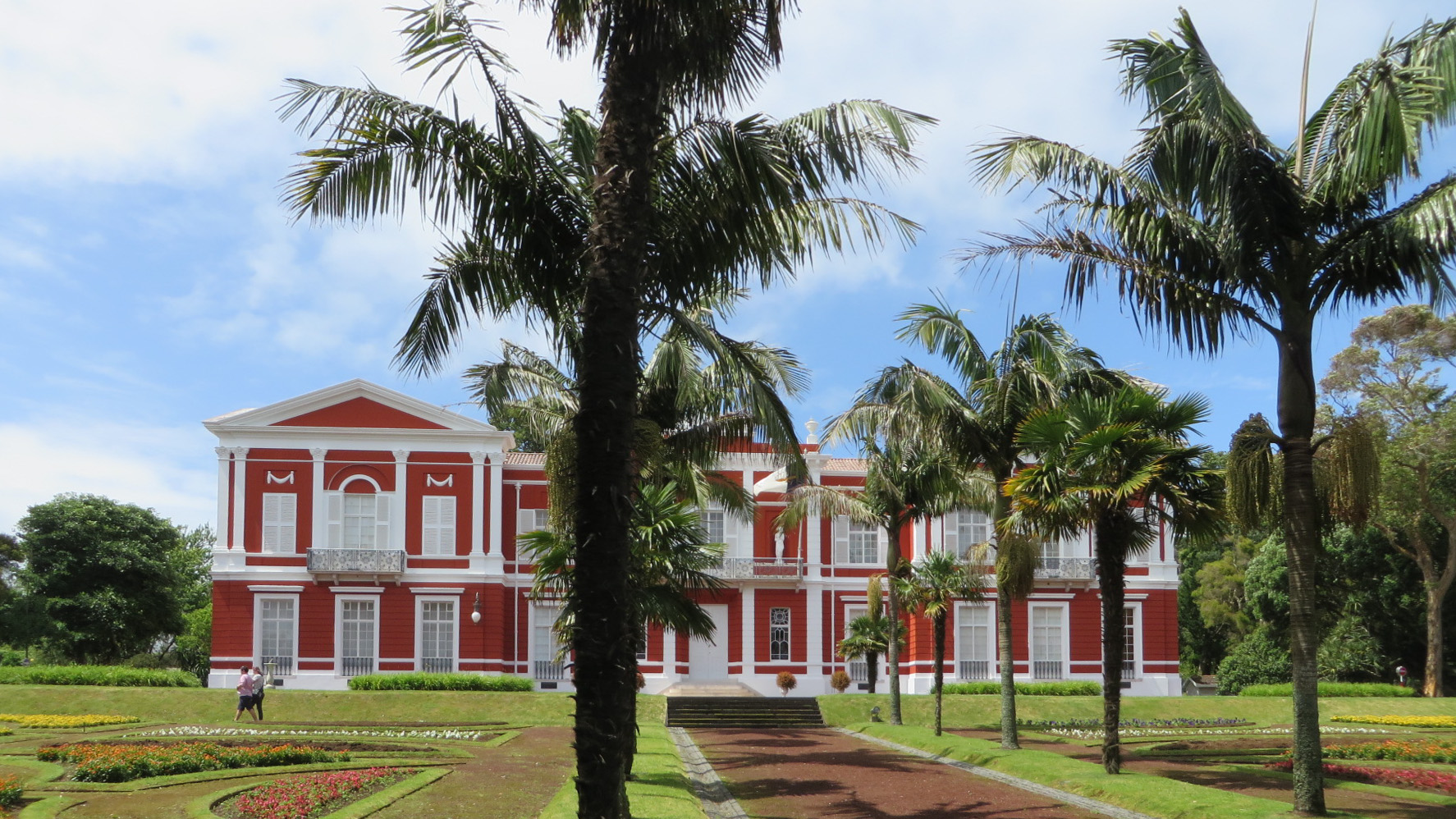
Sant'ana palace

- Palácio de São Lourenço
- Palace of the Bettencourts
- Sant'Ana palace
