= Church of Saint Ildefonso =

Igreja de Santo Ildefonso
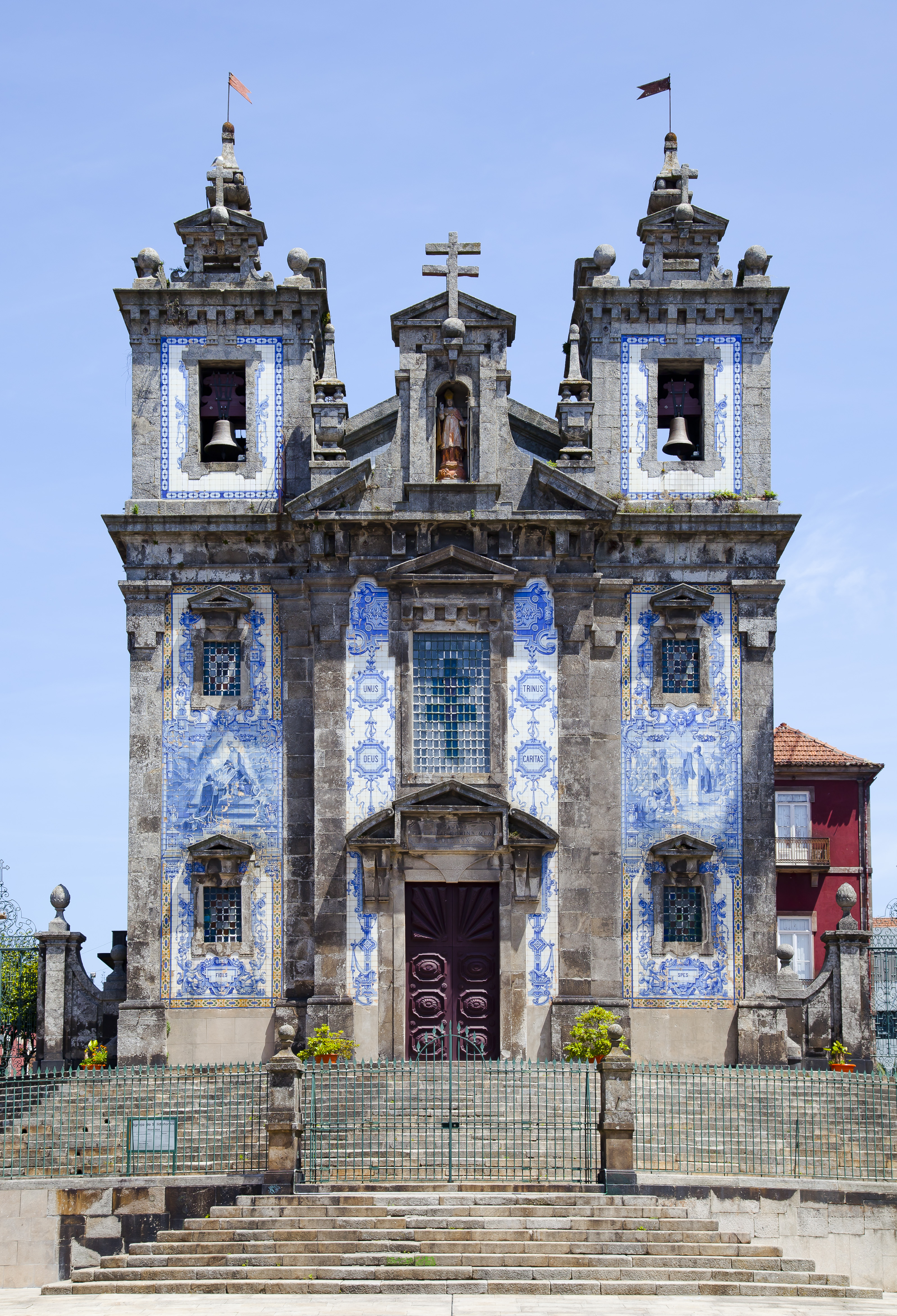
- Igreja de Santo Ildefonso
- 41°08′46″N 8°36′24″W
- Location: Porto
- Country: Portugal
- Denomination: Roman Catholic

Architecture
- Style: proto-Baroque
- Groundbreaking: 1709
- Completed: 18 July 1739

The Igreja de Santo Ildefonso is an eighteenth-century church in Porto, Portugal. The church is located near Batalha Square.

Completed in 1739, the church was built in a proto-Baroque style and features a retable by the Italian artist Nicolau Nasoni and a façade of 1932 azulejo tilework. The church is named in honour of the Visigoth, Ildephonsus of Toledo, bishop of Toledo from 657 until his death in 667.

== History ==
Prior to the building of the church of Saint Ildefonso, a chapel, known as Santo Alifon, stood on the site. Its construction date is unknown, but several early texts mention its existence. The earliest known reference to the site and the original chapel is in a work by a bishop of Porto, Vicente Mendes, dated 1296.

The aged chapel, in danger of collapsing, was demolished in 1709 and construction began on the new church that year. The building took thirty years to complete, finally inaugurated and blessed on 18 July 1739. The first stage of construction was completed in 1730, when the main body was finished and the tympanum, bearing the date M DCC XXX (1730), was placed. The second construction phase, from 1730 to 1739, saw the erection of the two bell towers, and the façade and narthex were finalised.

The architect of the Igreja de Santo Ildefonso is unknown, although records exist giving the names of the carpenters, masons, and locksmith who worked on the building.

Extensively repaired following a severe storm in 1819, the church also suffered damage from artillery fire on 21 July 1833 during the Siege of Porto. Over the years the church has undergone structural modifications and improvements, including the replacement of stained glass windows in 1967. The new ones were created by the artist Isolino Vaz.

During 1996 renovation works to the narthex, an area that corresponds to the original chapel's churchyard, nineteen graves were discovered.

== Features and usage ==
Constructed of granite, the shape of the church's main body is that of an elongated octagon, with decorative plaster ceilings. The façade, also granite, is regular and mostly plain, with two bell towers and a rectangular recess where a figure of the patron saint of the church stands. The bell towers include decorative cornices and dentils. Each tower is topped with masonry spheres, a stone cross, and a metalwork flag.

A monolithic obelisk stands to the left of the church, although it initially was erected on a set of steps extending toward Rua de 31 de Janeiro. Originally positioned to align with the bell tower of nearby Clérigos Church, it was moved to its present location when the steps were altered in 1924 to accommodate shops.

Two notable features of the church are the retable and the blue-and-white tiling. The artist and architect Nicolau Nasoni designed the retable, which was created and installed by architect Miguel Francisco da Silva in 1745.

Approximately 11,000 azulejo tiles cover the façade of the church, which were created by artist Jorge Colaço and placed in November 1932. The tiles depict scenes from the life of Saint Ildefonso and figurative imagery from the Gospels.

The church sits near Porto's Batalha Square, a historic, mostly pedestrian, public space that is frequented by tourists.
