= Fountain of São Miguel =

- Chafariz de São Miguel
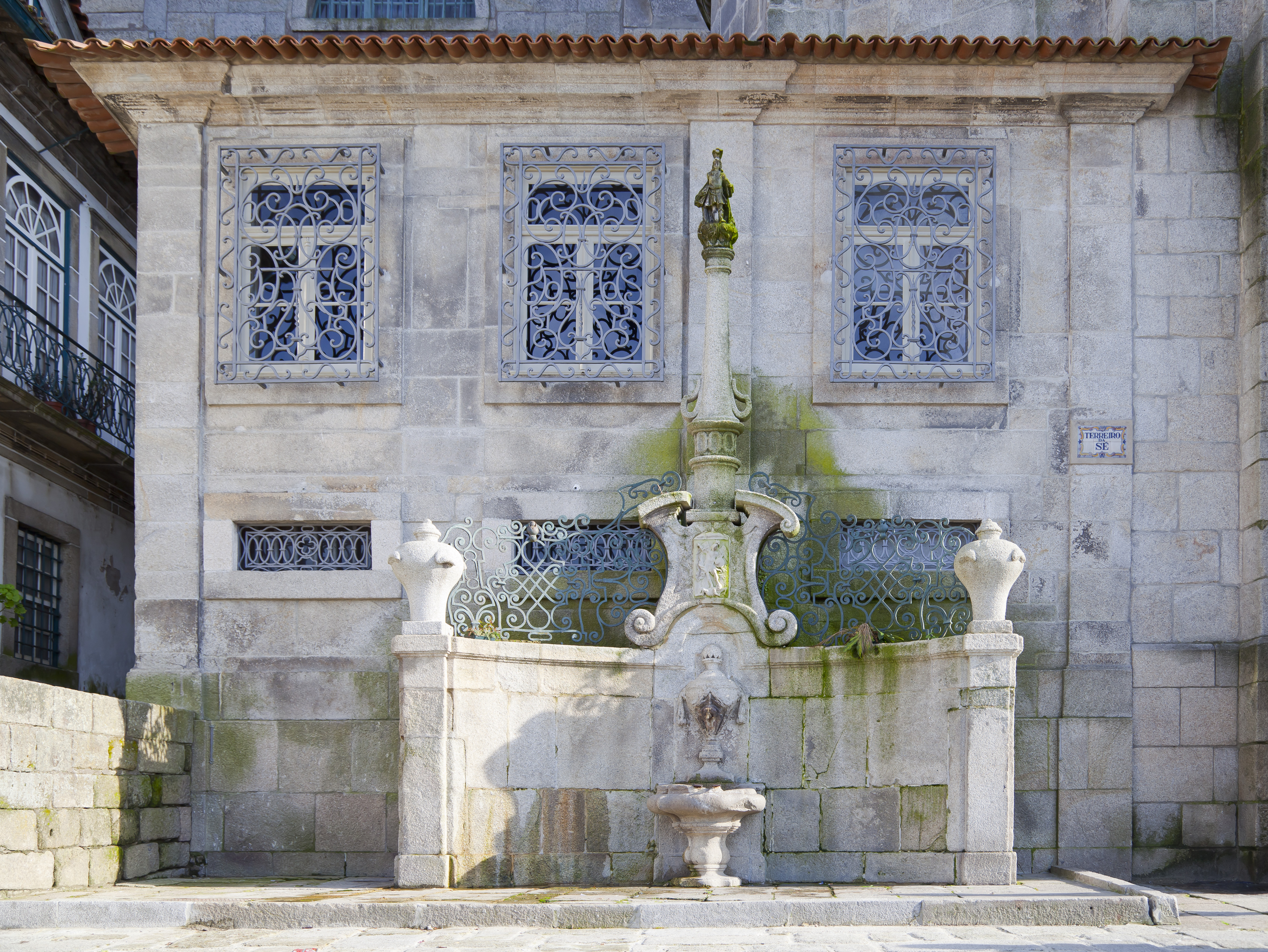
- The fountain as it stands on the north facade of Sé Cathedral
- Artist: Nicolau Nasoni
- Medium: Granite Fountain
- Subject: Archangel Michael
- Location: Porto, Portugal
- 41°08′35″N 8°36′39″W
- Owner: Portuguese Republic
- Website: Official Site

The Fountain of São Miguel (Portuguese: Chafariz de São Miguel) is a fountain located in the civil parish of Cedofeita, Santo Ildefonso, Sé, Miragaia, São Nicolau e Vitória, in the Portuguese north, municipality of Porto, classified as a Imóvel de Interesse Público (Property of Public Interest).

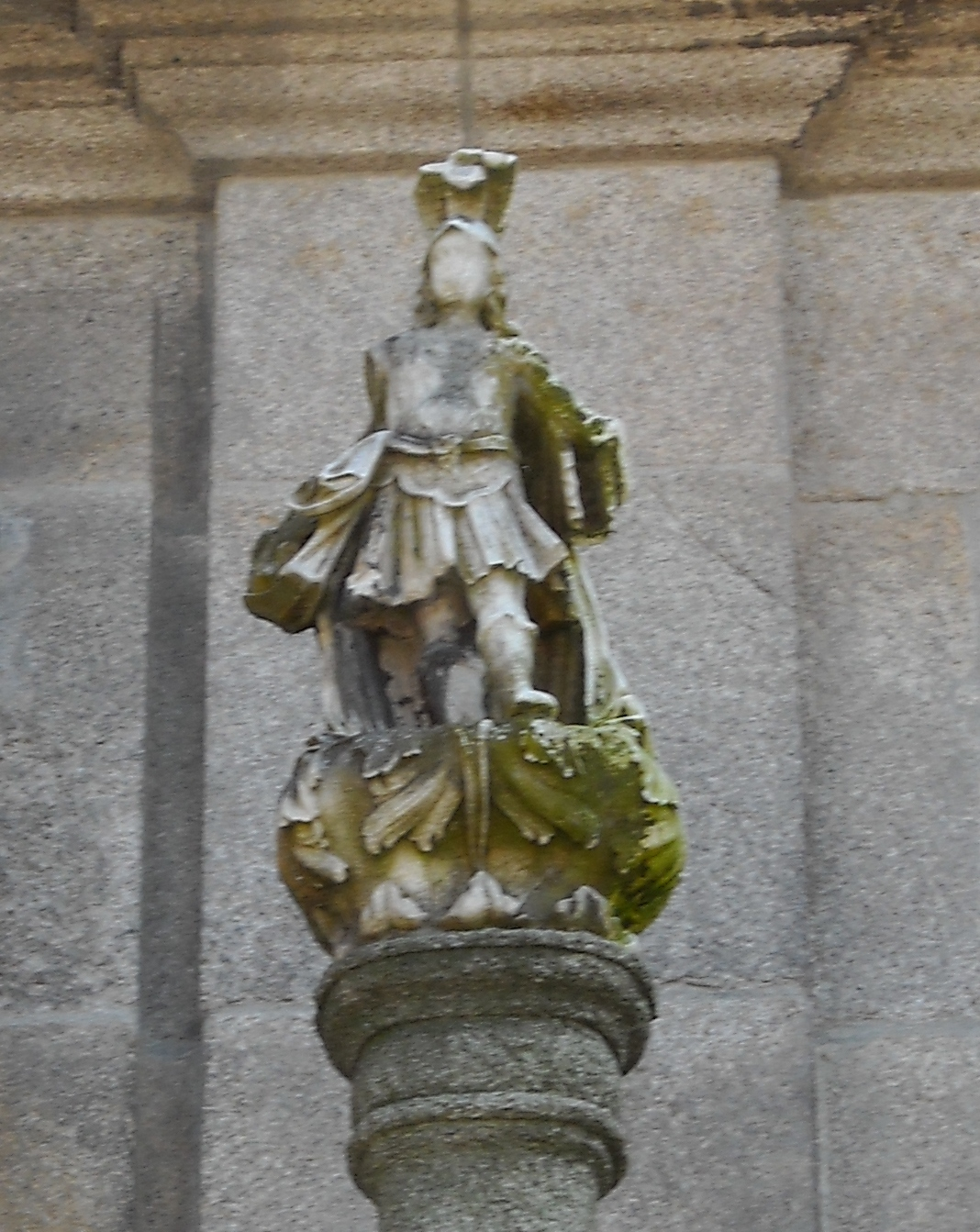
The small statute of the Archangel Michael

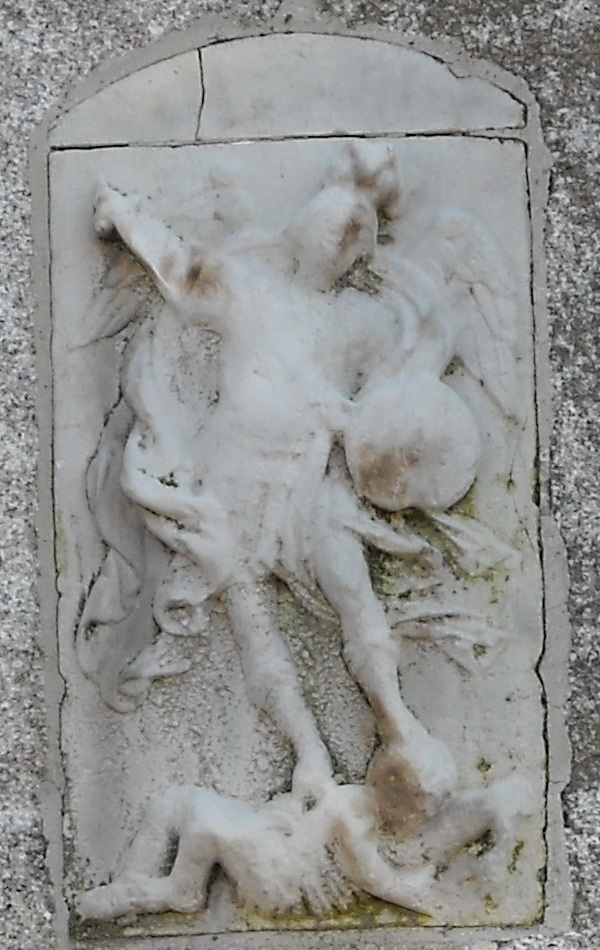
The central bas-relief of Michael and the devil
