= Feu Guião Palace =

Palace in Setúbal, Portugal

- Palácio Feu Guião
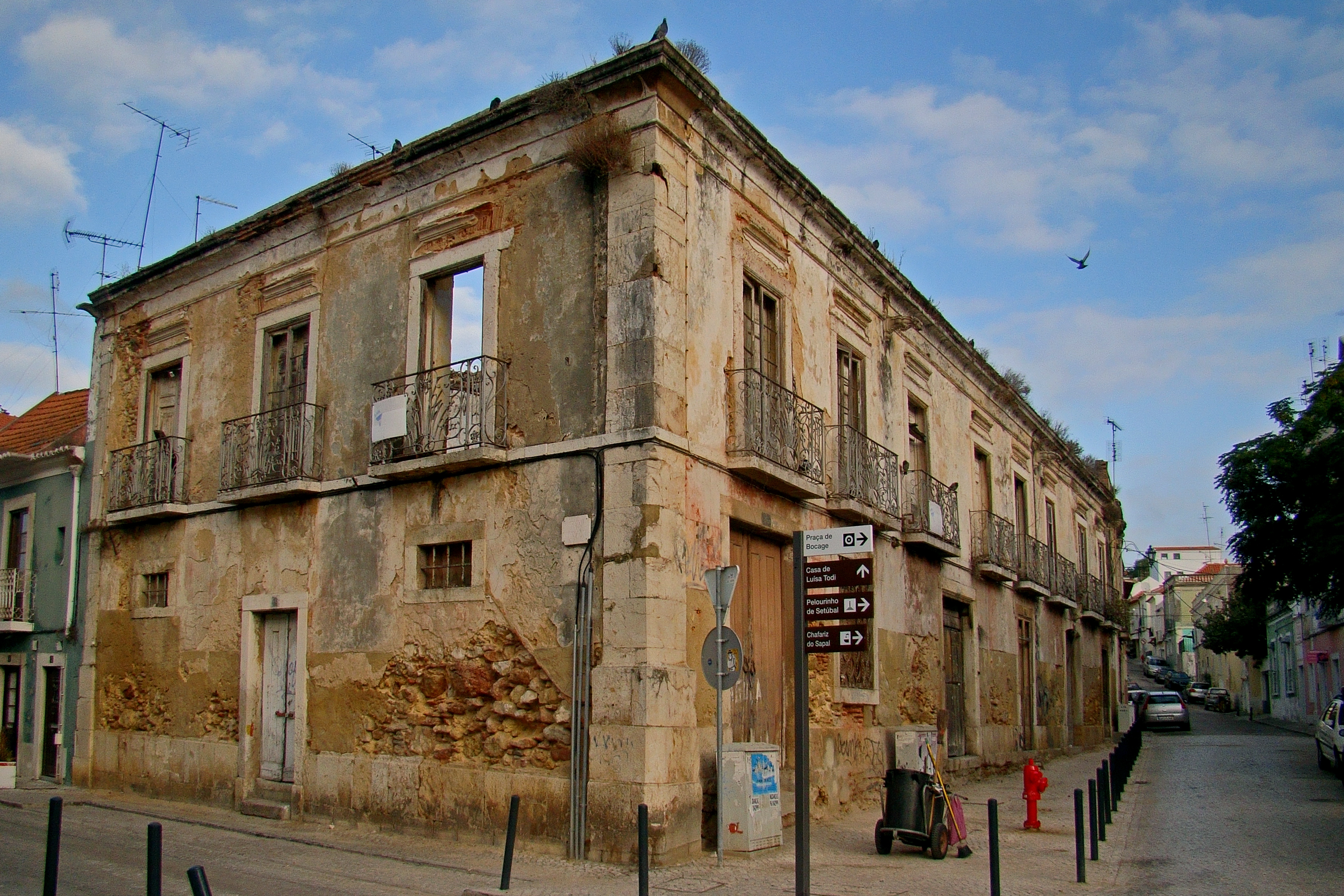
- The Feu Guião Palace, before the restoration works, in 2011
- Location: Setúbal, Portugal
- Coordinates: 38°31′28″N 8°53′58″W
- Designer: José da Rosa Guião e Abreu
- Type: Neoclassical mansion, Cultural heritage
- Completion date: 1700s
- Restored date: 2017-2023
- Status: Property of Municipal Interest

The Feu Guião Palace, Feu Guião Family Palace or Palace of the Adeantado, (Portuguese: Palácio Feu Guião), is an old mansion located in the Troino neighborhood, in the freguesia of São Julião, Nossa Senhora da Anunciada e Santa Maria da Graça, in Setúbal. It was built in the 18th century and restored from significant disrepair starting 2017.

== History ==
The mansion was built in the mid-18th century with great architectural simplicity and some slightly magnificent motifs, such as the family coat of arms and four gargoyles.

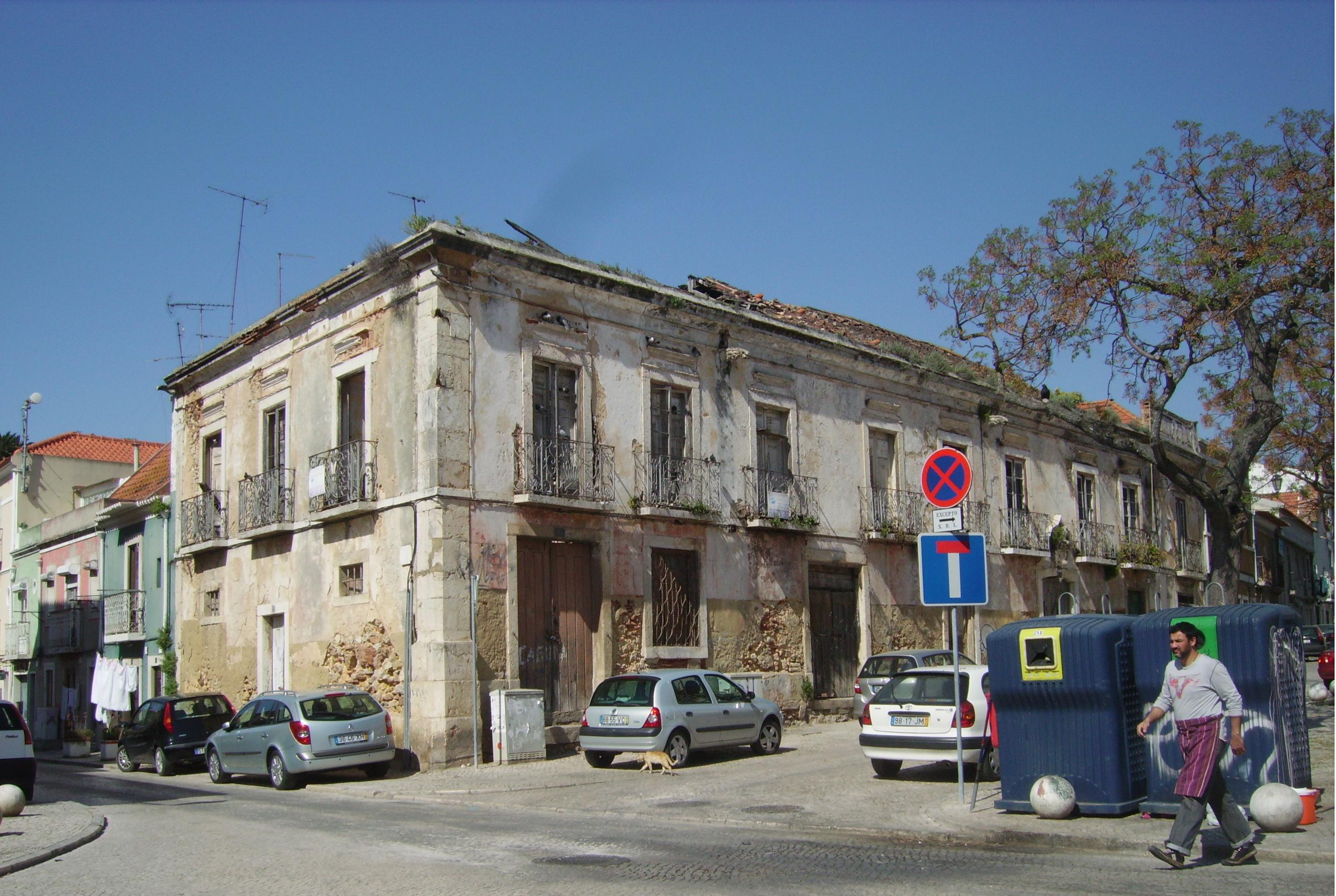
Feu Guião Palace in a high degree of deterioration, 2009

The name is thought to have originated from the author of the work, José da Rosa Guião e Abreu, who at the time was a famous desembargador on the rise in society.

The other name, the Palace of the Adeantado, is also attributed to the fact that José da Rosa was also the corregedor (Adeantado) of the Kingdom.

The building remained in the hands of the Feu Guião family until 1881, when it was auctioned off by Manuel Maria Valente.

After serving as a residence for almost two centuries, the building was occupied by various institutions, including a primary school. But the palace was hit by the 1969 Portugal earthquake, which affected the entire Setúbal city centre, and over the years it fell into a state of disrepair.

== Restoration ==
As this is a building of great historical and cultural impact, which stands out from everything else that surrounds it, to avoid the demolition or its collapse due to its high state of disrepair, restoration works began in 2017 and they ended in 2023 with the complete restoration of the palace. It is now a residential complex.

== See also ==
- Portuguese nobility
- List of palaces in Portugal
