= Pinto Leite Palace =

Mansion in Porto, Portugal

- Palacete Pinto Leite
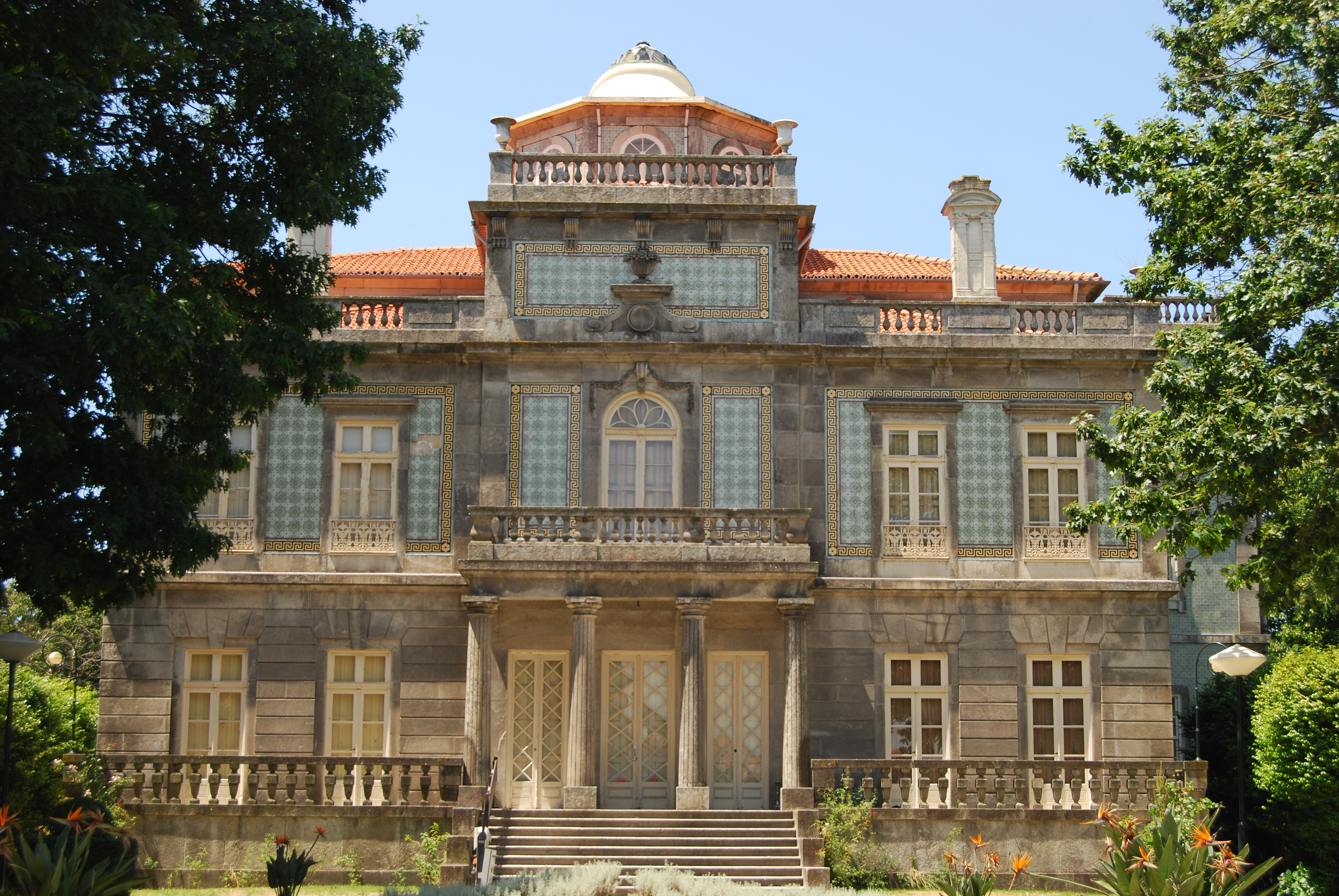
- Pinto Leite Palace in 2010
- Interactive map of the Pinto Leite Palace area

General information
- Type: Mansion
- Architectural style: Neoclassical
- Location: Lordelo do Ouro e Massarelos, Porto, Portugal
- Coordinates: 41.15151°N 8.62280°W
- Construction started: 1830

The Pinto Leite Palace, previously known as Casa do Campo Pequeno, in English, house of the small field, is a 19th-century noble house located in Lordelo do Ouro e Massarelos, Porto, Portugal. It was built by order of Joaquim Pinto Leite, member of Porto's Pinto Leite family, one of the most powerful at that time in the city.

== History ==
Construction of the palace started in 1830. It is currently located besides the Maternidade Júlio Dinis.

In 1966, the palace was acquired by the Câmara Municipal of Porto to instal the Conservatório de Música do Porto, that only ended up happening in 1975.

As of 2024, it lies abandoned since 2008, since the Conservatório de Música do Porto was transferred somewhere else. In 2016, the municipality put the palace up for public auction, for a base price of 1.55 million euros, for purposes "exclusively of a cultural, artistic or similar nature". It was sold for the sum of 1.643 million euros to a company owned by the former footballer António Oliveira as well as António Moutinho Cardoso, an art collector who promises to create a cultural space open to the city.

In 2019, António Oliveira, abandoned the project and he ceded its position (50%) to the partner, António Moutinho Cardoso.

After the adaptation works, the palace is expected to host artist residencies, temporary exhibitions and the collection of more than 300 paintings by contemporary painters by Moutinho Cardoso.

== Pinto Leite family ==
The Pinto Leite family was one of the most influential in Porto, and in the country, in the mid-19th century. Their social visibility was very strong in Porto at the time.

Joaquim Pinto Leite was vice-president of the Associação Civilizadora in 1846 and was on the organizing committee for the festival of St John of Porto in the Clérigos district in 1849. In 1853, he donated 24$000 towards the construction of the Trindade Hospital. That same year, he gave the city council a new fire pump.

His brother, José Pinto Leite, donated the sum of one conto de réis to the relief fund for those affected by yellow fever in Lisbon in 1857. Married to her uncle Sebastião Pinto Leite, José Pinto Leite's daughter, Clementina Libânia Pinto Leite, Countess of Penha Longa and Viscountess of Gandarinha, also exercised public charity on several occasions, particularly in 1860 and 1861, allocating part of the manor house and property of Gandarinha to the creation of the Gandarinha Asylum, now the Countess of Penha Longa Foundation.
