= Episcopal Palace, Porto =

Portuguese bishop's residence

Coordinates: 41.1420°N 8.6116°W

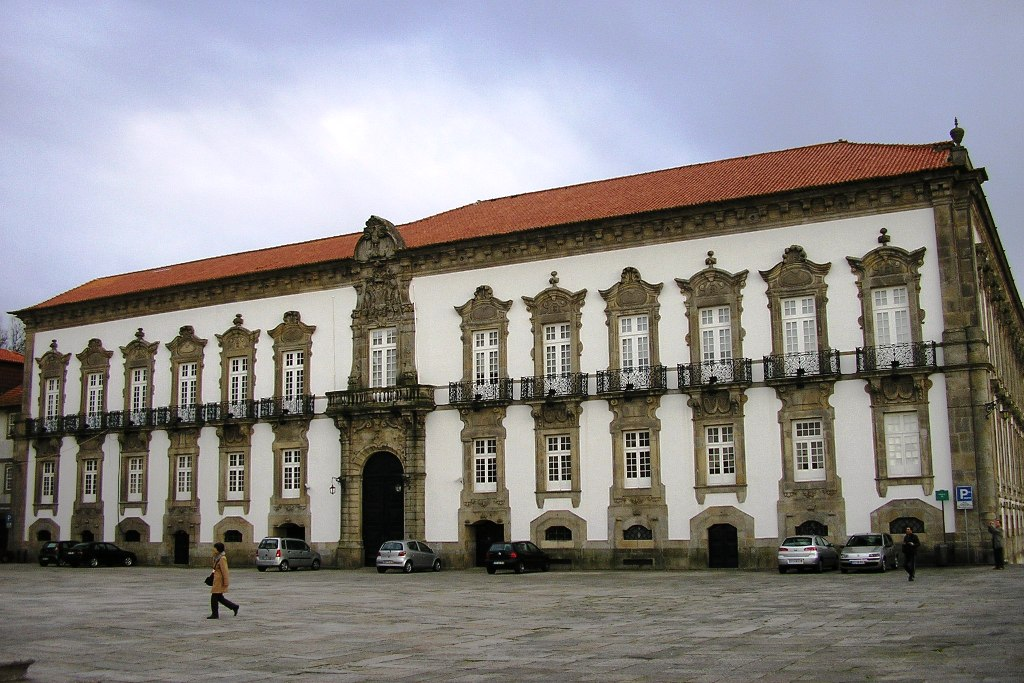
Episcopal Palace of Porto

The Episcopal Palace (Portuguese: Paço Episcopal) is the residence of the bishops of Porto, in Portugal. The palace is located on a high elevation, near Porto Cathedral, and dominates the skyline of the city. It is part of the historical centre of Porto, designated World Heritage Site by UNESCO.

The palace is an important example of late Baroque and Rococo civil architecture in the city.

== History ==
The original Episcopal Palace of Porto was built in the 12th or 13th century, as attested by some architectural vestiges like romanesque-style windows that exist inside the present building. In 1387, this medieval palace witnessed the marriage of John I of Portugal and Philippa of Lancaster.

During the 16th and 17th centuries the palace was greatly enlarged, and an old drawing shows it to be composed of a series of buildings with towers, as was typical for the architecture of Portuguese manor houses of the period. The present palace, however, is the result of a radical rebuilding campaign carried out in the 18th century, which turned it into a baroque work.

It is believed that the project for the Bishop's Palace was drawn in 1734 by the Italian Nicolau Nasoni, an architect with an extensive work in Porto and surroundings. Building work started in 1737, under the direction of architect Miguel Francisco da Silva, and proceeded slowly. The bishopric of Porto was vacant from 1716 to 1741, as the Pope failed to confirm the nominee. Due to financial constraints, the original project could never be completed and had to be reduced in scale. The works were only finished in the last decades of the 18th century, under the rule of Bishop Rafael de Mendonça, whose coat-of-arms is located on the main portal and the inner monumental staircase of the palace.

The building was used as residence for the bishops of the city until the 19th century. During the Siege of Porto of 1832, the bishop fled the city and the palace was used by Peter IV's troops as stronghold in the battle against Miguel I. Much later, between 1916 and 1956, when the bishops no longer inhabited the palace, the palace served as seat of the Municipality of Porto.

== Architecture ==
The Episcopal Palace is of rectangular shape with a courtyard in the middle. The main façade is painted white with three rows of windows and a central portal in dark granite. The frames of the higher row of windows come in different Rococo frames. The main portal has a balcony topped by the coat-of-arms of Bishop Rafael de Mendonça, who saw the completion of the building.

Upon entering the palace, the visitor goes through a long vestibule that leads to the stairway, which is the highlight of the interior. The monumental stairway, attributed to Nasoni, is composed of a first flight of steps followed by a U-shaped stair. The stairway leads to a baroque portal again with the coat-of-arms of Bishop Mendonça. The whole room is harmoniously decorated with wall paintings and stucco executed between the 18th and the 19th centuries in neoclassical style. In the same century a glass dome was added that provides abundant light to the interior. Other rooms of the palace have less artistic relevance.

== See also ==
- List of Baroque residences
