= Palace of the Counts of Azambuja =

- Palácio dos Condes da Azambuja
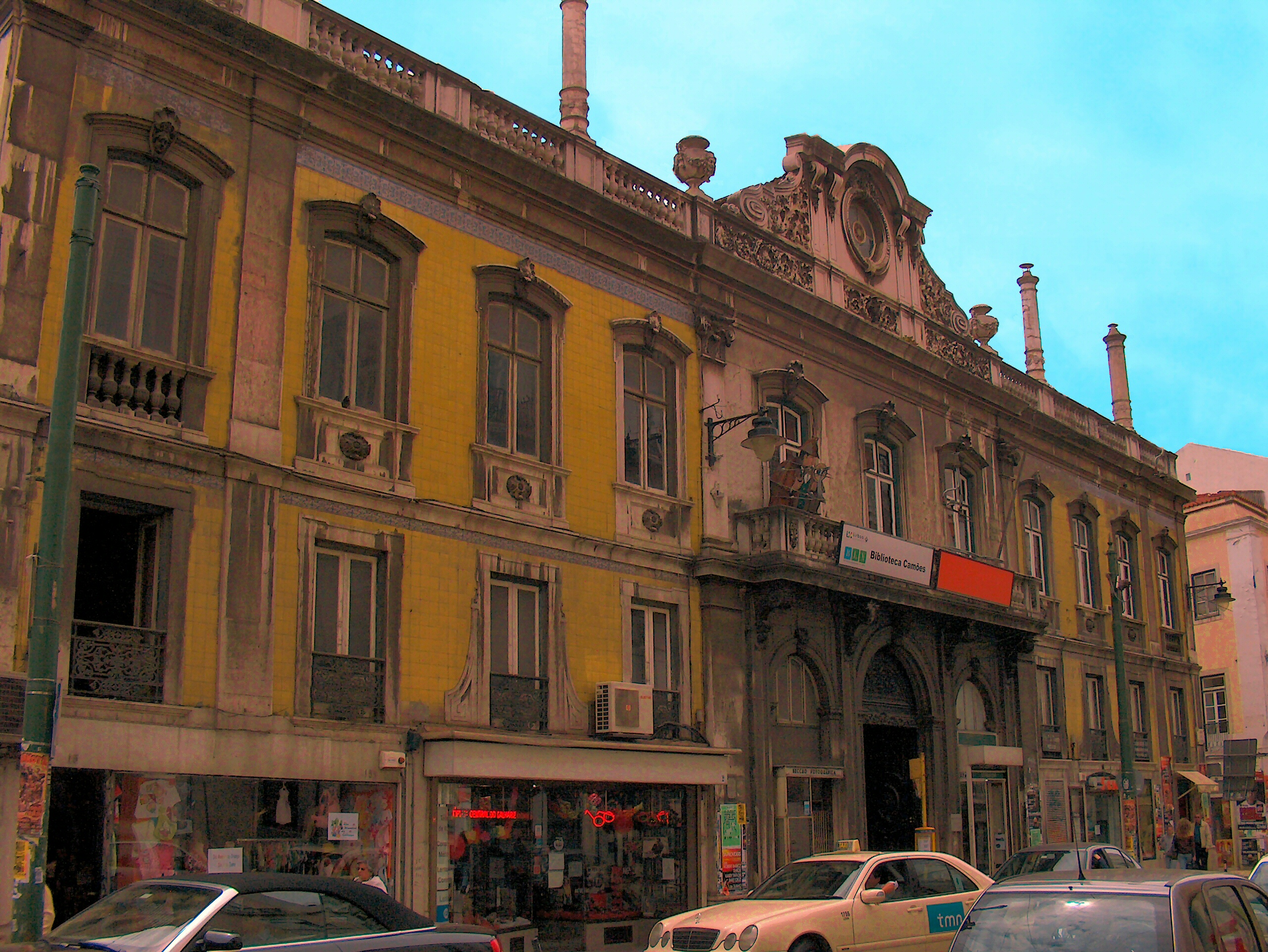
- Interactive map of the Palace of the Counts of Azambuja area

General information
- Type: Palace
- Architectural style: Art Nouveau
- Location: Misericórdia, Portugal
- Coordinates: 38°42′39″N 9°8′46″W
- Owner: Portuguese Republic

Technical details
- Material: Mixed masonry

The Palace of the Counts of Azambuja (Portuguese: Palácio dos Condes da Azambuja), alternately the Palace Valada-Azambuja (Portuguese: Palácio Valada-Azambuja) is a 16th-century Portuguese estate manorhouse/palace situated in the civil parish of Misericórdia, municipality of Lisbon.

== History ==
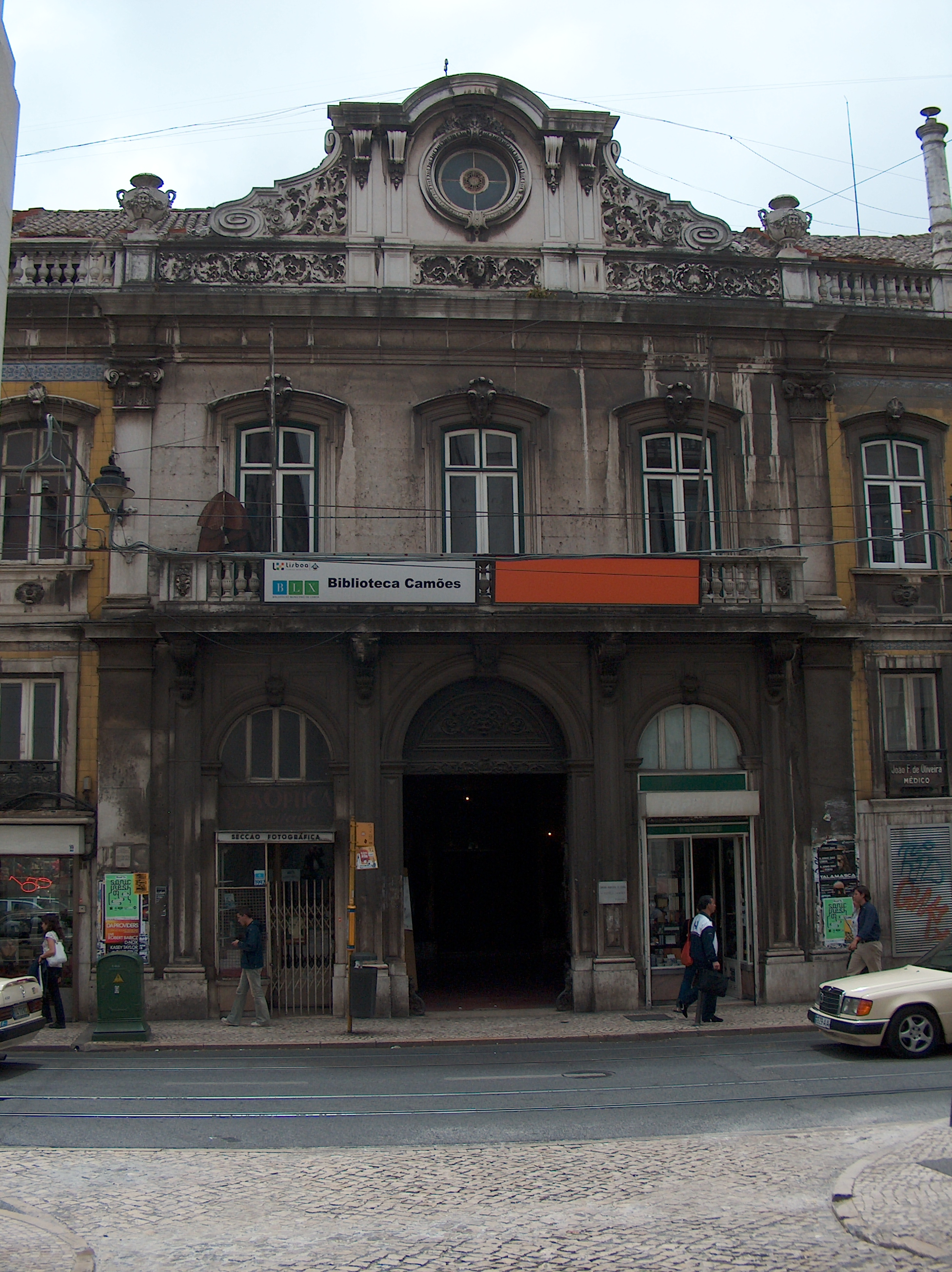
The facade of the former Palace Valada-Azambuja

By the 16th century a palace already existed on the site, but was destroyed on 1 November 1755, following the events of the Lisbon earthquake.

Following its reconstruction, the residence was occupied by the family of the 1st Marquess of Valada and 1st Count of Caparica, D. Francisco de Meneses de Silveira e Castro (1754–1834).

In 1867, the palace was acquired by the council Francisco José da Silva Torres, that linked the manor to the Countess of Azambuja.

By 1925, the property-owner was Manuel Henriques de Carvalho, who provided spaces in the building to the operators of the newspaper A Lucta (becoming its headquarters). Other commercial spaces were eventually opened on the ground floor.

By the 1990s, a library existed in the location.

The construction company, Lucios, demolished the interiors in 2004, transforming the spaces into 10 residential apartments (between T0 and T2 configurations). The project also included the remodelling of the roof and construction of an elevator.

== Architecture ==
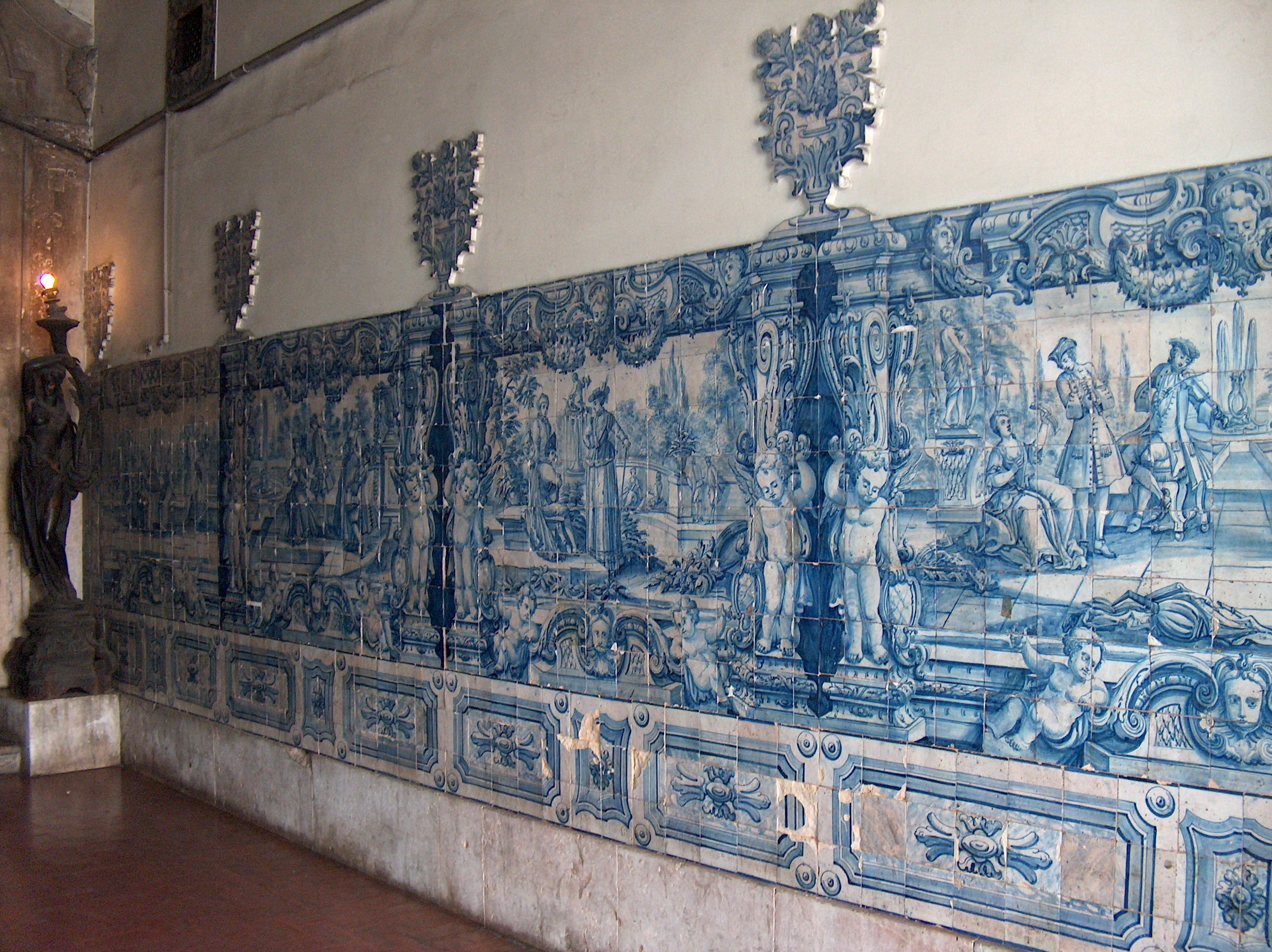
Examples of the elaborate azulejo tile within the former-residence

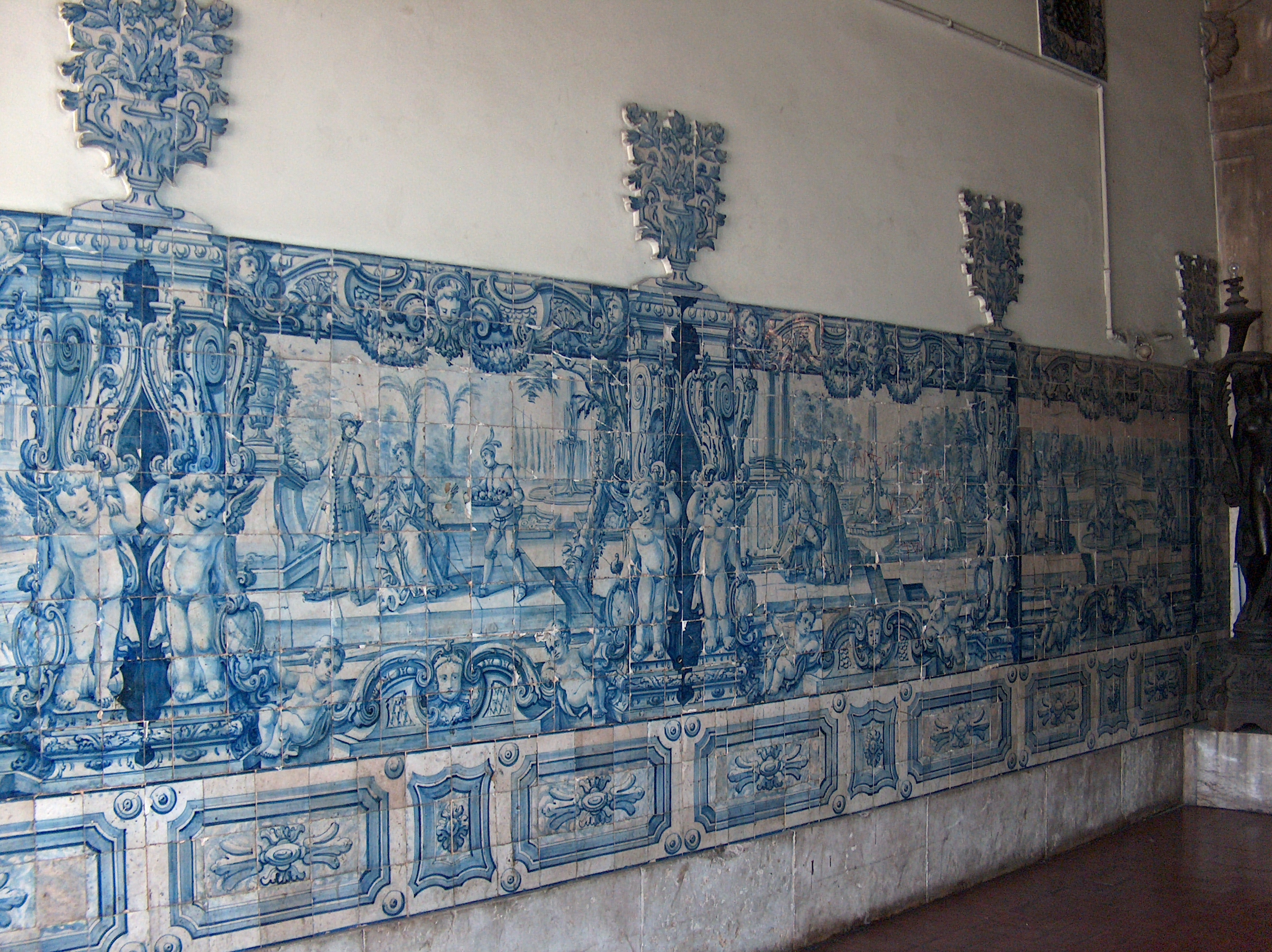
Examples of the elaborate azulejo tile within the former-residence

The three-story building forms a U-shaped uniform plan separated by pilasters and covered in tiled roof. There are three volumes, with three registers divided by architectural elements: the ground floor occupied by shops, the second consisting of simple rectangular windows and the final floor adorned with larger windows with rounded lintels and balustrade varanda.

The central facade is surmounted by a triangular pediment with oculus, decorated by various motifs in bas-relief depicting vegetal forms.

The interior is distinguished for its 18th-century azulejo panels representing gallant scenes, flanked by accented tiles forming divisions as pilasters and surmounted by vases. A marble staircase, covered in vaulted ceiling includes decoration in relief stuccos. Similarly, there are two other triangular azulejo panels depicting Saint Francis of Assisi and Saint Martial.
