= Nicolau Nasoni =

Italian artist and architect

- Born: Niccoló Nasoni; 2 June 1691; San Giovanni Valdarno, Grand Duchy of Tuscany
- Died: 30 August 1773 (aged 82); Porto, Kingdom of Portugal
- Occupations: Artist and architect

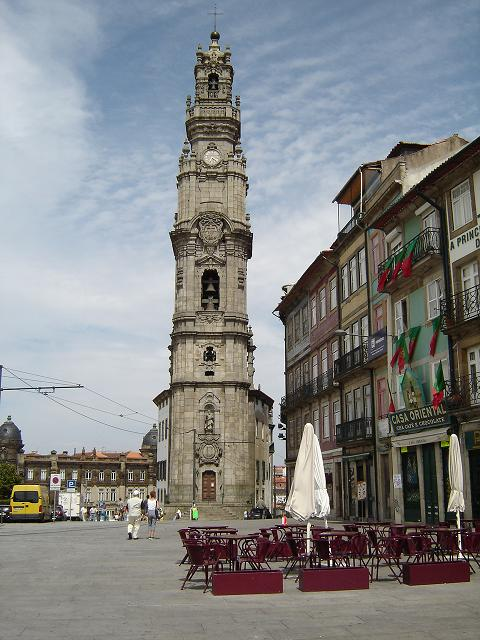
Tower of Clérigos Church

Nicolau Nasoni (or originally Niccoló Nasoni, 2 June 1691 – 30 August 1773) was an Italian artist and architect mostly active in Portugal.

He became one of the most influential figures in Portuguese Baroque architecture with his original and vigorous and theatrical style of Baroque and Rococo architecture.

== Biography ==
Born in San Giovanni Valdarno, Grand Duchy of Tuscany, he received his education in Siena from Giuseppe Nicolo Nasini (1657–1736) from 1713 and 1720. During this early period he constructed a catafalque for Ferdinando de Medici in the cathedral of Siena and the triumphal arch for the reception of the new archbishop. At the same time he studied architecture and painting while working with his master for the Opera del Duomo di Siena.

He was then employed, first as a painter in Rome and, between 1723 and 1725, in Malta. The new Grand Master of the Order of Malta was a Portuguese nobleman Dom António Manoel de Vilhena. Nasoni designed the Mars display for the parade in his honour. The theatrical design of this display attracted the attention of Count Francisco Picolomini, who in turn informed the Grand Master. Niccoló Nasoni then received a commission to paint the ceilings of the Council Chamber, or Throne Room and corridors of the Magisterial Palace. His work was much appreciated and he soon became famous as a decorative painter. Nasoni also painted frescoes in other buildings in Malta, such as Palazzo Spinola.

His time in Malta was cut short due to unspecified legal or financial troubles, leading to his swift and necessary departure for Portugal. These troubles were possibly related to debt or a conflict with the local authorities or the Grand Master himself. Nasoni was briefly imprisoned shortly before his departure to Portugal. At the invitation of Jerónimo de Távora e Noronha, the Dean of Porto, Portugal, whose brother Roque de Távora, he had met in Malta, Nasoni moved to Porto in 1723 (or 1725), where he would remain till his death in 1773.

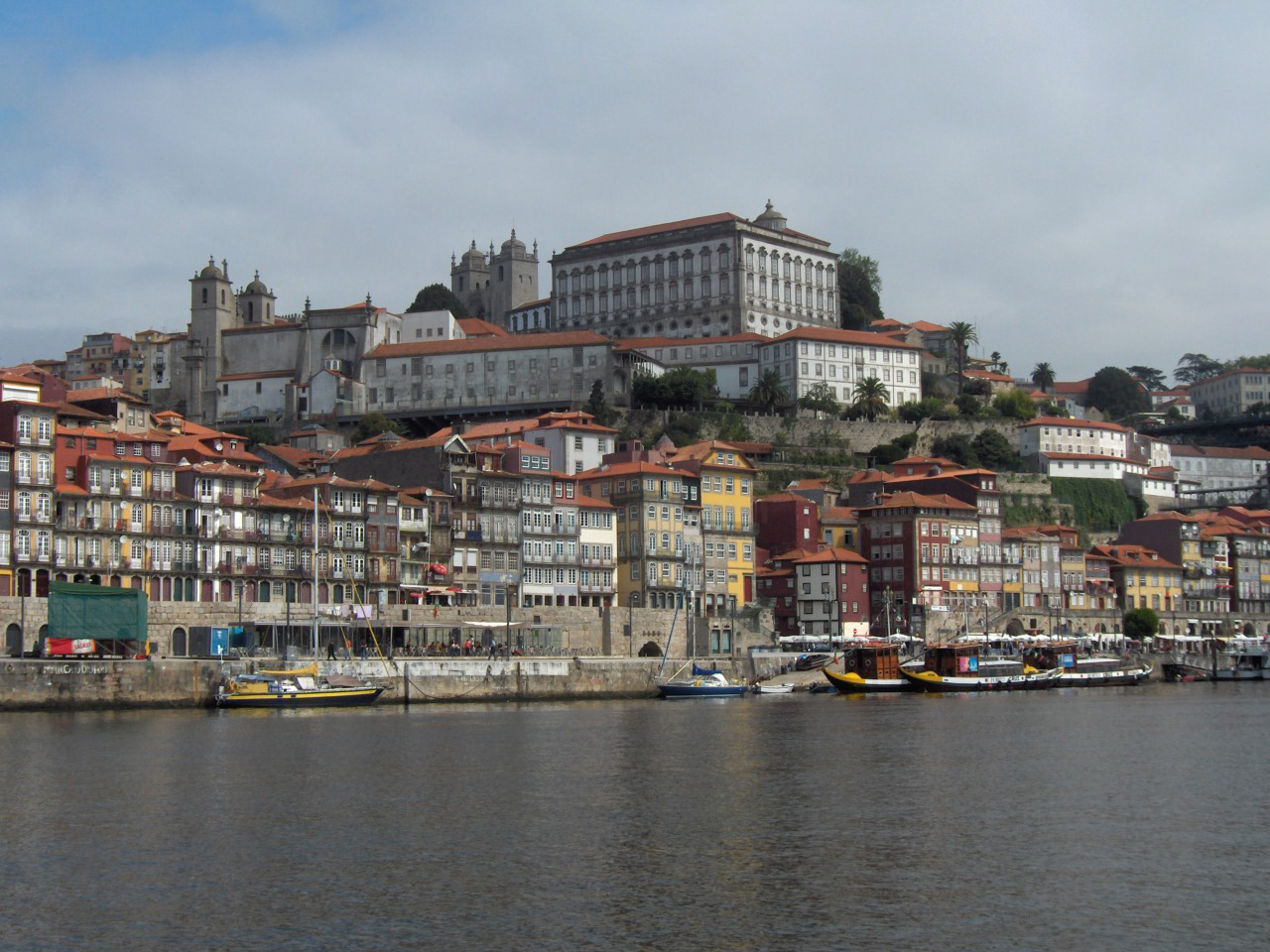
Former Episcopal Palace of Porto overlooking the Ribeira in Porto

His first recorded works in Porto were frescoes on the walls of the cathedral in 1725, which are now fading. Here he introduced to Portugal the illusionist effects, called quadratura, typical for this period. He was given the assignment to redecorate and modernise this cathedral, still Romanesque at that time. He added the granite porch (1736) of the north façade and the loggia with the azulejos. His silver altarpiece with flying angels, garlands, acanthus and twisted columns in Manueline style, is an elaborate work. He also designed the two organ-cases. He decorated the doorcases in the apse of the cathedral and in the cloister (1733–1736) with a rich variety of ornament, whose designs go back to the Florentine Bernardo Buontalenti. Next he undertook the building of the vast Episcopal Palace of Porto, next to the cathedral. Its façade is 58 m long. He designed it in 1734 but the construction only started in 1741. Only part of the palace was completed during his lifetime.

In 1729 he married Isabella Castriotto Ricciardi, a Neapolitan woman of noble descent. She died the next year through complications of childbirth. The godfather of José, his son, was a Portuguese nobleman who asked him in 1731 to design the church and the spectacular granite tower of São Pedro dos Clérigos in Porto. This would become, according to scholars, his greatest work (1732–63). It would become the most significant and innovative architectural event in the renovation of Porto during the first half of the 18th century. Together with his other realizations, it would transform Porto into the most Baroque of Portuguese cities. The ground plan has an oval form, something most unusual in churches. It withstood the great earthquake of 1755.

In 1731 he was married again, this time to a Portuguese woman, Antónia Mascarenhas Malafaia.

Other major works in Porto and northern Portugal:

- loggia of the Porto Cathedral
- Palace of São João Novo (1723–1733) (Porto) (it now houses the Ethnographic and Historical Museum)
- Cathedral of Lamego (1738–1743): rebuilding of the cathedral and painting of the false cupolas on the nave, using quadratura techniques.
- Frescoes depicting the Apocalypse (1739; destroyed) on the ceiling of the nave of the church Sta. Eulália, Cumeeira, in the province of Trás-os-Montes
- Igreja do Bom Jesus (1743), a magnificent Baroque church in Matosinhos, just north of Porto. Here he added an element of horizontality (rather rare in Portuguese architecture).
- Quinta do Chantre (1743): garden walls with fountains along a central axis, leading to the house with a central tower
- Igreja de Santa Marinha (1745), Vila Nova de Gaia (on the other side of the river Douro, facing Porto)
- Retable in the Igreja de Santo Ildefonso (1745)
- Designs for the orphanage of Nossa Senhora da Esperança (1746)
- Quinta de Ramalde (1746): adding Neo-Gothic elements such as decorative battlements to the central tower.
- façade of the Misericórdia Church (1749) (Porto)
- the Palace of Freixo (1750) (Porto)
- the central part of the palace of Mateus (Solar de Mateus) (attributed to Nasoni on stylistic grounds; finished in 1750) (Vila Real)
- Quinta da Prelada (finished before 1758): one of his most theatrical designs, full of fantasy, such as the granite fountain of the Tortoise (but not completed)
- Capela Nova (Vila Real)

His specialty was the talha dourada, a technique to decorate woodwork with gold leaves. This sculptured gilt wood became typical for the Portuguese baroque art. This technique was applied to altars, altarpieces, statues, retables and baldachins giving an overwhelming impression of opulence on entering a church. During the Counter Reformation this wealth of ornament was encouraged to impress the believers with the wealth and the richness of the Catholic faith. Nicolau Nasoni introduced in Portugal the concave form of the retable and the undulant arch at the top. By applying these elements, he followed the example of Andrea Pozzo (as explained in Perspectiva pictorum et architectorum). He exercised a great influence on his contemporaries with his wood sculpture. A good example is the retable on the main altar of the church of Santo Ildefonso in Porto, where he used the same thematic decorative elements as in his architectural designs (asymmetrical shells, acanthus foliage, volutes and husks, with the addition of flying angels).

In his designs for ecclesiastical silver, he used these same motifs again: winged angels, acanthus leaves and garlands (silver altarpiece in the cathedral of Porto). And again in the iron railings and gates of the chancel arch in the same cathedral.

In 1743 he entered the Clérigos Brotherhood. He was buried, at his request, in an unmarked tomb in the crypt of the Clérigos Church.

He had, as an architect and painter, an enormous influence in the northern part of Portugal even if he didn't found a school or train new followers. One of his successors was the painter and architect José de Figueiredo Seixas, who had worked under Nasoni's direction.

== Issue ==
By Isabella Castriotto Ricciardi:

- José Nasoni Barberino de Mascarenhas Malafaia, or Friar José Nasoni (8 June 1730), monk and Bachelor of Canon law from University of Coimbra

By Antónia de Mascarenhas Malafaia:

- Margarida Nasoni de Mascarenhas (27 July 1731– 23 April 1821), married Manuel de Matos Pereira, Professed Knight in the Order of Christ, without issue
- António Nasoni Barberino de Mascarenhas Malafaia (20 December 1732), exiled in India
- Jerónimo (7 September 1734)
- Francisco (14 January 1736)
- Ana de Mascarenhas Nasoni (26 May 1737 – 26 January 1800), married António Félix de Campos e Mesquita Pirralho, had issue

== Bibliography ==
- Curl, James Stevens (2006) [2006]. A Dictionary of Architecture and Landscape Architecture (Paperback) (Second ed.). Oxford University Press. p. 880 pages. ISBN 0-19-860678-8.
- Turner, J. (1990) Grove Dictionary of Art. MacMilllan Publishers Ltd. ISBN 1-884446-00-0.
- Robert C. Smith (1971). "Baroque and Rococo Braga: Documenting Eighteenth-Century Architecture and Sculpture in Northern Portugal". Proceedings of the American Philosophical Society. 115 (3): 214–220.
- Smith, Robert C. (1973) Nicolau Nasoni (1691–1773); Livros Horizonte, Lisbon.
