= Clérigos Church =

Baroque church in Porto, Portugal

- Igreja dos Clérigos
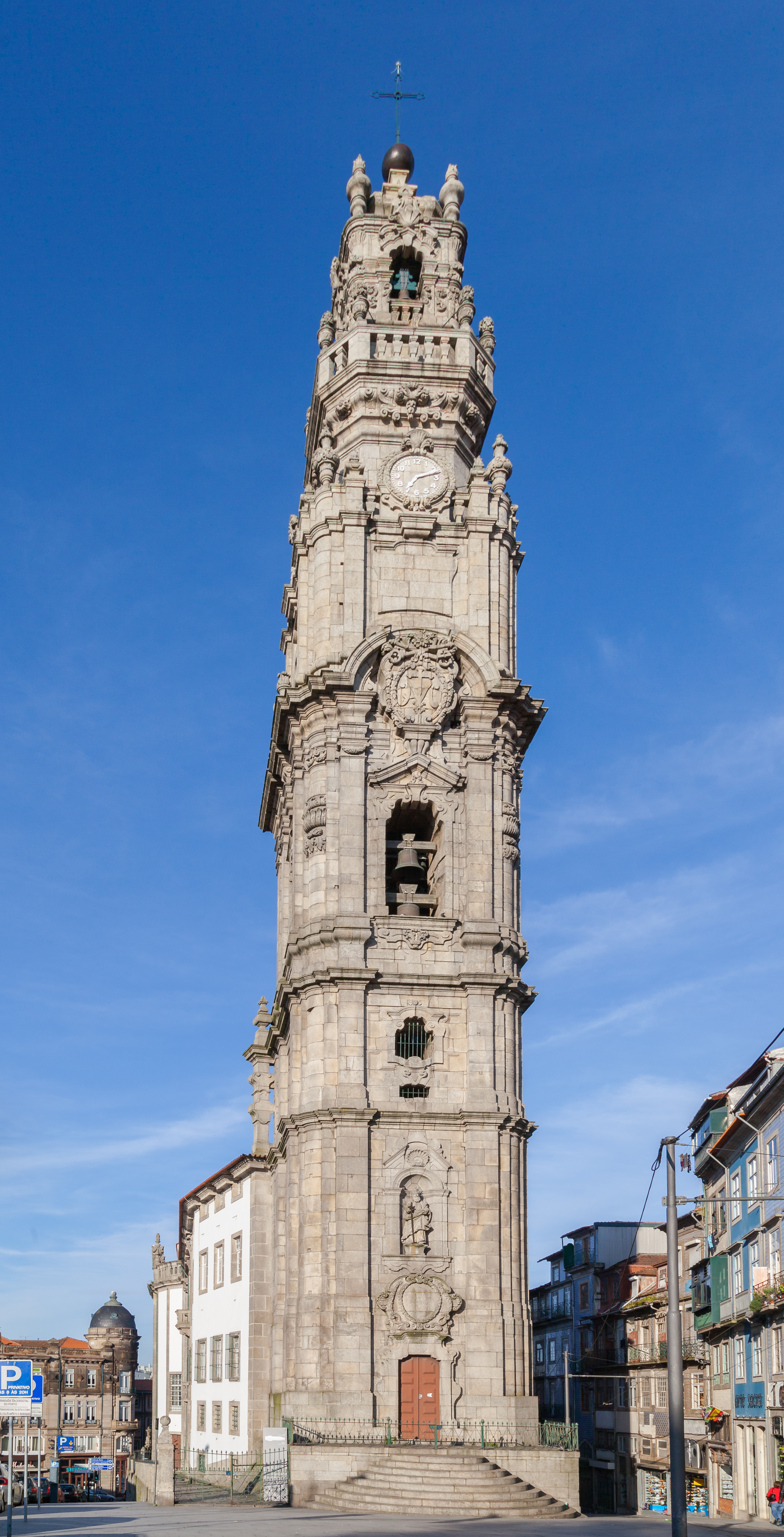
- Clérigos tower

Religion
- Affiliation: Roman Catholic

Location
- Location: Porto, Portugal
- Interactive map of Clérigos Church
- Coordinates: 41°08′44.4″N 8°36′52.5″W

Architecture
- Architect: Nicolau Nasoni
- Groundbreaking: 1732
- Completed: 1750

Website
- www.torredosclerigos.pt/en/

The Clérigos Church (Portuguese: Igreja dos Clérigos, pronounced [ˈklɛɾiɣuʃ]; "Church of the Clergymen") is a Baroque church in the city of Porto, in Portugal. Its 75-meter-tall bell tower, the Torre dos Clérigos, can be seen from various points of the city and is one of its most characteristic symbols.

== History ==
The church was built for the Brotherhood of the Clérigos (Clergy) by Nicolau Nasoni, an Italian architect and painter who left an extensive body of work in the north of Portugal during the 18th century.

Construction of the church began in 1732 and was finished in 1750, while the bell tower and the monumental divided stairway in front of the church were completed in 1763. The main façade of the church is heavily decorated with baroque motifs (such as garlands and shells) and an indented broken pediment. This was based on an early 17th-century Roman scheme. The central frieze above the windows present symbols of worship and an incense boat. The lateral façades reveal the almost elliptic floorplan of the church nave.

== Overview ==
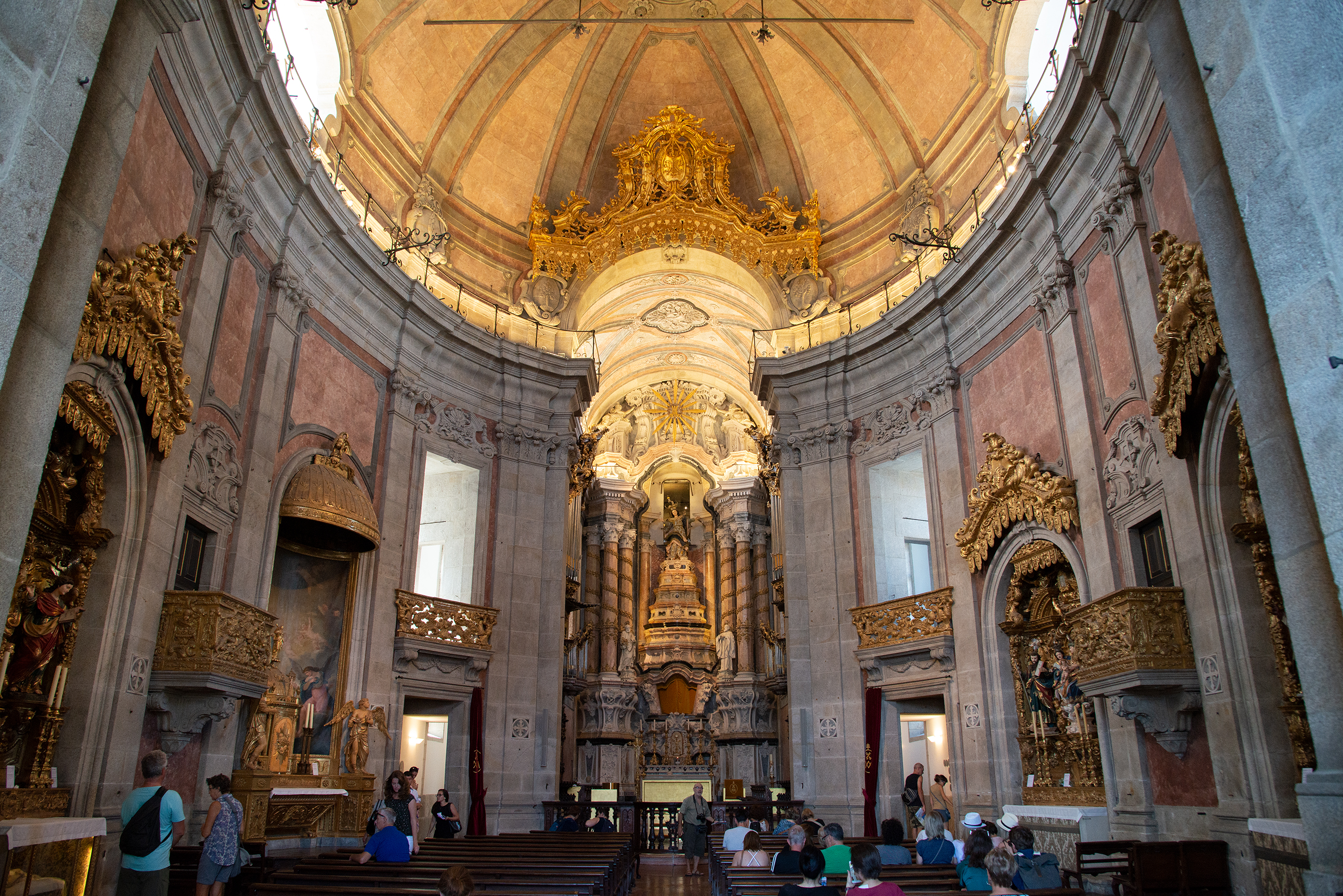
Clérigos Church interior

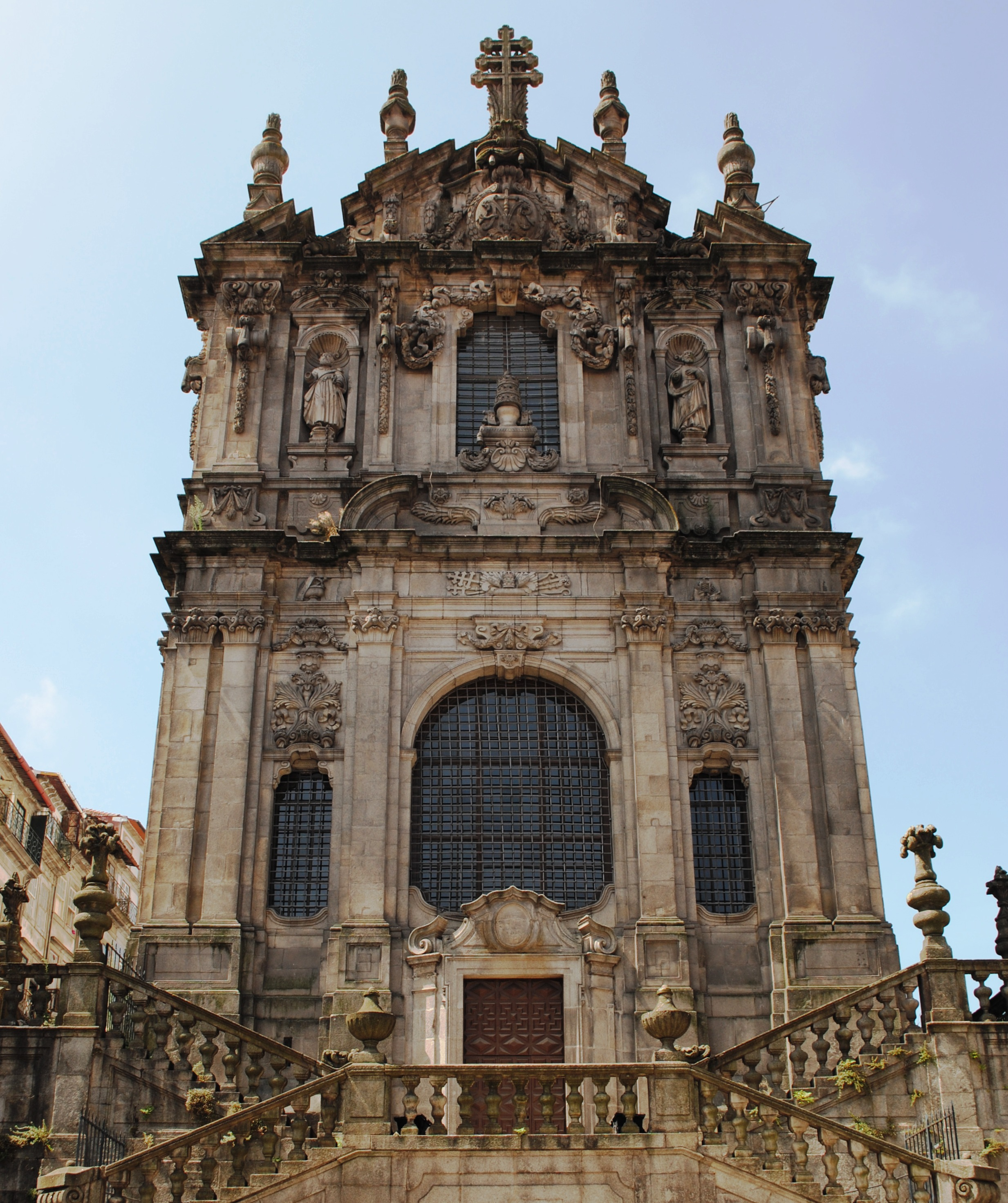
Clérigos Church facade

The Clérigos Church was one of the first baroque churches in Portugal to adopt a typical baroque elliptic floorplan. The altarpiece of the main chapel, made of polychromed marble, was executed by Manuel dos Santos Porto.

The monumental tower of the church, located at the back of the building, was only built between 1754 and 1763. The baroque decoration here also shows influence from the Roman Baroque, while the whole design was inspired by Tuscan campaniles. The tower is 75.6 metres high, dominating the city. There are 240 steps to be climbed to reach the top of its six floors. This great structure has become the symbol of the city.

In Porto, Nicolau Nasoni was also responsible for the construction of the Misericórida Church, the Archbishop's Palace and the lateral loggia of Porto Cathedral. He entered the Clérigos Brotherhood and was buried, at his request, in the crypt of the Clérigos Church, with the exact place remaining unknown.

In June 2015, the Clérigos Brotherhood announced that after 250 years, the Clérigos Tower and Church will open its doors during nighttime hours.

== See also ==
- List of carillons
- List of tallest structures built before the 20th century
