= Porto Cathedral =

Catholic cathedral in Porto, Portugal

Sé do Porto Cathedral of the Assumption of Our Lady
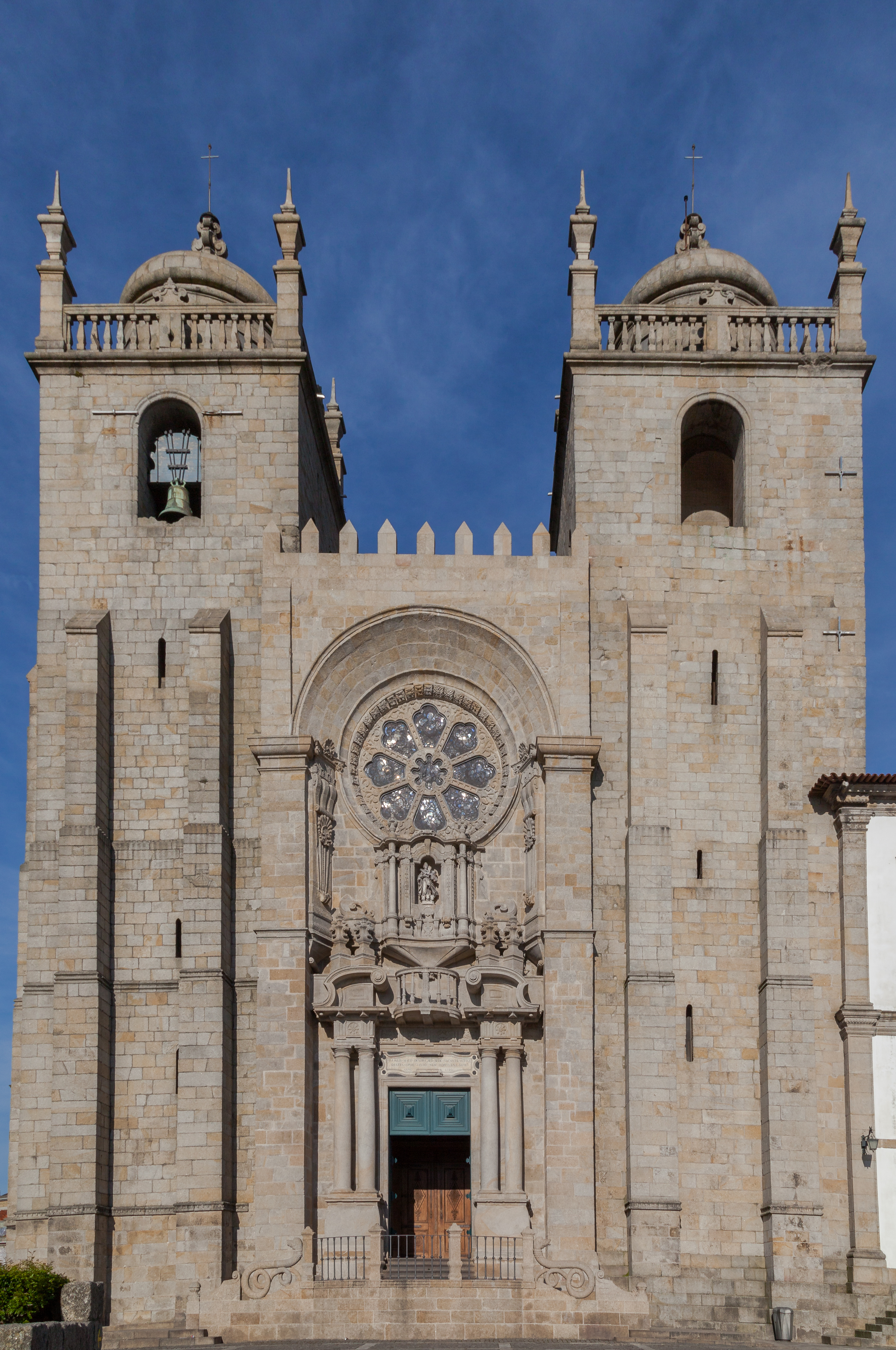
- Façade of the Porto Cathedral

Religion
- Affiliation: Roman Catholic
- Diocese: Porto District
- Province: Roman Catholic Diocese of Porto
- Ecclesiastical or organisational status: Cathedral

Location
- Location: Porto, Portugal
- Interactive map of Sé do Porto; Cathedral of the Assumption of Our Lady
- Coordinates: 41.1428°N 8.6113°W

Architecture
- Type: Church
- Style: Romanesque, Gothic, Baroque
- Groundbreaking: 1110
- Completed: 1737

The Porto Cathedral (Portuguese: Sé do Porto) is a Roman Catholic church located in the historical centre of the city of Porto, Portugal. It is one of the city's oldest monuments and one of the most important local Romanesque monuments.

== Overview ==
The cathedral was built on the site of an old chapel or hermitage founded by Henry of Burgundy and his wife in 1108. The pre-Romanesque church is mentioned in the De Expugnatione Lyxbonensi as still extant in 1147, so construction of the present building began in the second half of the 12th century and work continued until the 16th century. There were major Baroque additions in the 18th century, and further changes were made in the 20th century.

The cathedral is flanked by two square towers, each supported with two buttresses and crowned with a cupola. The façade lacks decoration and is rather architecturally heterogeneous. It shows a Baroque porch and a beautiful Romanesque rose window under a crenellated arch, giving the impression of a fortified church.

The Romanesque nave is rather narrow and is covered by barrel vaulting. It is flanked by two aisles with a lower vault. The stone roof of the central aisle is supported by flying buttresses, making the building one of the first in Portugal to use this architectonic feature.

This first Romanesque building has suffered many alterations but the general aspect of the façade has remained romanesque.

Around 1333 the Gothic funerary chapel of João Gordo was added. João was a Knight Hospitaller who worked for King Dinis I. His tomb is decorated with his recumbent figure and reliefs of the Apostles. Also from the Gothic period is the elegant cloister, built between the 14th and the 15th centuries during the reign of King John I, who married English Princess Philippa of Lancaster in Porto Cathedral in 1387.

The external appearance of the cathedral was greatly altered during Baroque times. In 1772 a new main portal substituted the old Romanesque original and the tower cupolas were altered. In 1736 Italian architect Nicolau Nasoni added an elegant Baroque loggia to the lateral façade of the cathedral. During the War of the Oranges whilst the battle at Amarante was taking place a group of Spanish soldiers briefly took control of the cathedral before being overcome by the locals of the town. A marble plaque with a Magnetite backing now hangs up behind the altar in order to remind everyone of those who died whilst regaining control of the chapel. The magnetite backing was chosen in order to remind those travelling near the cathedral by interfering with the direction in which their compass points,

The interior was also altered during the baroque era. In one of the chapels there is a magnificent silver altarpiece, built in the second half of the 17th century by Portuguese artists. Also in the 17th century the romanesque apse (which had an ambulatory) was torn down and a new one was built in baroque style, later decorated with new wall paintings by Nasoni and choir stalls. The altarpiece of the chapel, designed by Santos Pacheco and executed by Miguel Francisco da Silva between 1727 and 1729, is an important work of Portuguese Baroque.

The three red marble holy-water fonts, supported by a statue, date from the 17th century. The baptistery contains a bronze bas-relief by António Teixeira Lopes, depicting the baptism of Christ by John the Baptist.

The South transept arm gives access to the Gothic cloister, which is decorated with baroque azulejos by Valentim de Almeida (between 1729 and 1731). They depict some scenes from the Song of Songs. The remains of the Early-Romanesque ambulatory contain a few sarcophagi. The terrace is decorated with tile panels by António Vidal. The coffered ceiling of the chapter house was painted with allegories of moral values by Pachini in 1737.

Mass is celebrated at 11am each day.

== Gallery ==
Baroque loggia on the north facade

Romanesque nave looking toward the Baroque chancel

Baroque chancel and high altar

Choir stalls in the chancel

Rose window above the organ at the west end

Baroque sacristy

Gothic cloister

West gallery of the Gothic cloister

== See also ==
- Lisbon Cathedral
- Silves Cathedral
- Viseu Cathedral

== Sources ==
- Portugal/1 - Europa Romanica, Gerhard N Graf, Ediciones Encuentro, Madrid, 1987
- General Bureau for National Buildings and Monuments (Portugal)
