= Baroque architecture in Portugal =

Architectural style

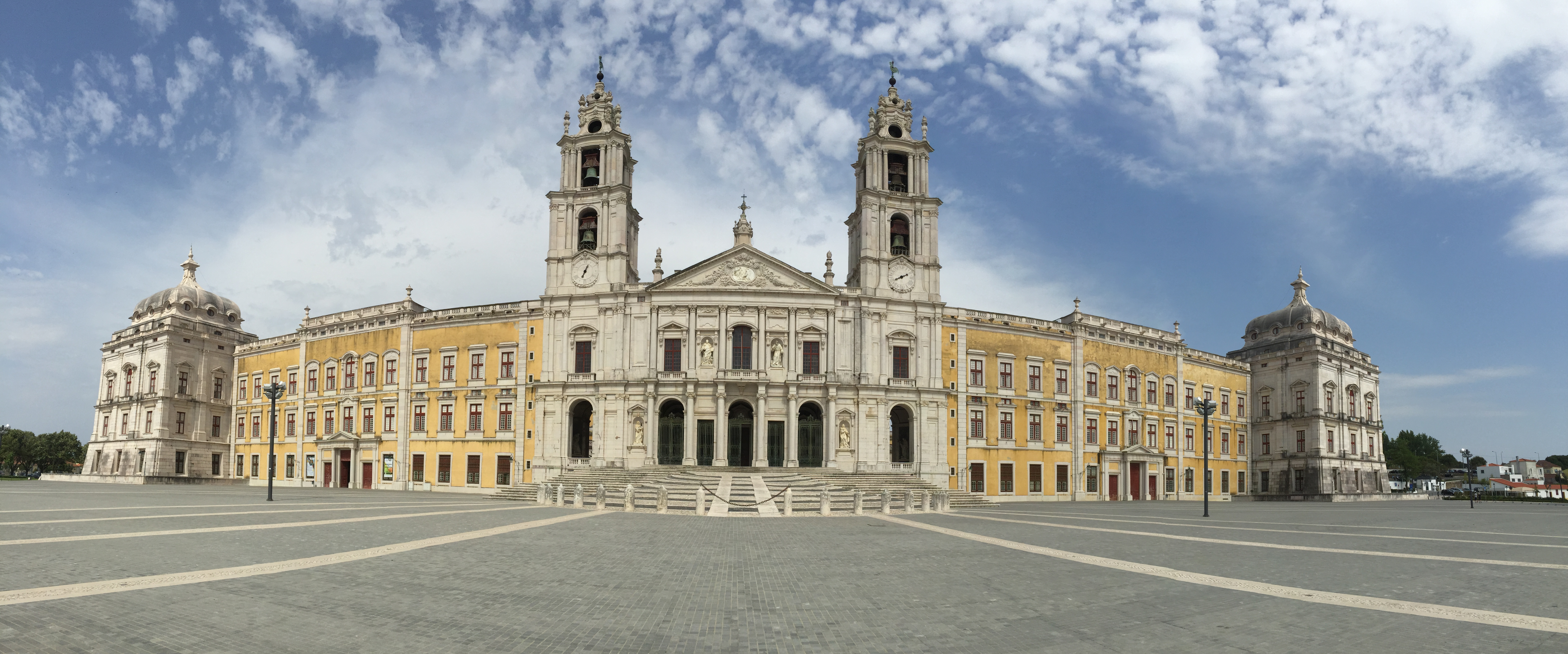
Mafra National Palace, panoramic view

Baroque architecture in Portugal lasted about two centuries (the late seventeenth century and eighteenth century). The reigns of John V and Joseph I had increased imports of gold and diamonds, in a period called Royal Absolutism or Absolute monarchy, which allowed the Portuguese Baroque to flourish.

== Baroque architecture ==
Baroque architecture in Portugal arose on a different timeline from the rest of Europe and was influenced by several political, artistic and economic factors. It begins during a complicated moment, with the financial effort of the kingdom channelled to the Portuguese Restoration War after 60 years of Iberian Union.

Another key factor is the existence of the Jesuitical architecture, also called "plain style" (Estilo Chão).

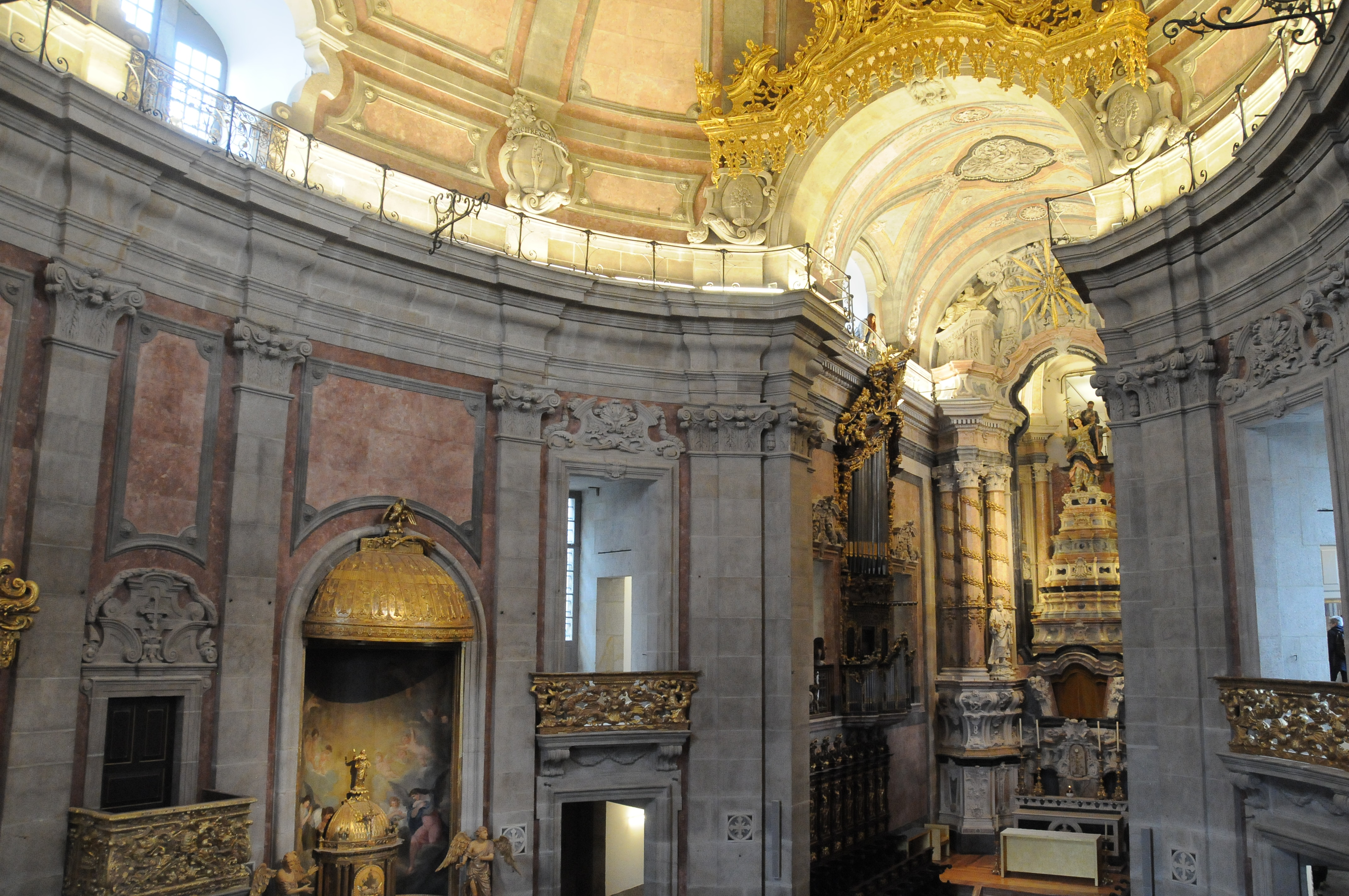
Clérigos Church interior, Porto

The buildings are single-room basilicas, deep main chapel, lateral chapels (with small doors for communication), without interior and exterior decoration, with a simple portal and windows. It is a very practical building, allowing it to be built throughout the empire with minor adjustments, and prepared to be decorated later or when economic resources are available. The first Portuguese Baroque does not lack in building because "plain style"” is easy to be transformed, by means of decoration (painting, tiling, etc.), turning empty areas in pompous baroque scenarios. The same could be applied to the exterior. Subsequently, it is easy to adapt the building to the taste of the time and place. Practical and economical.

== The International Baroque ==
Church of Santa Engrácia in Lisbon

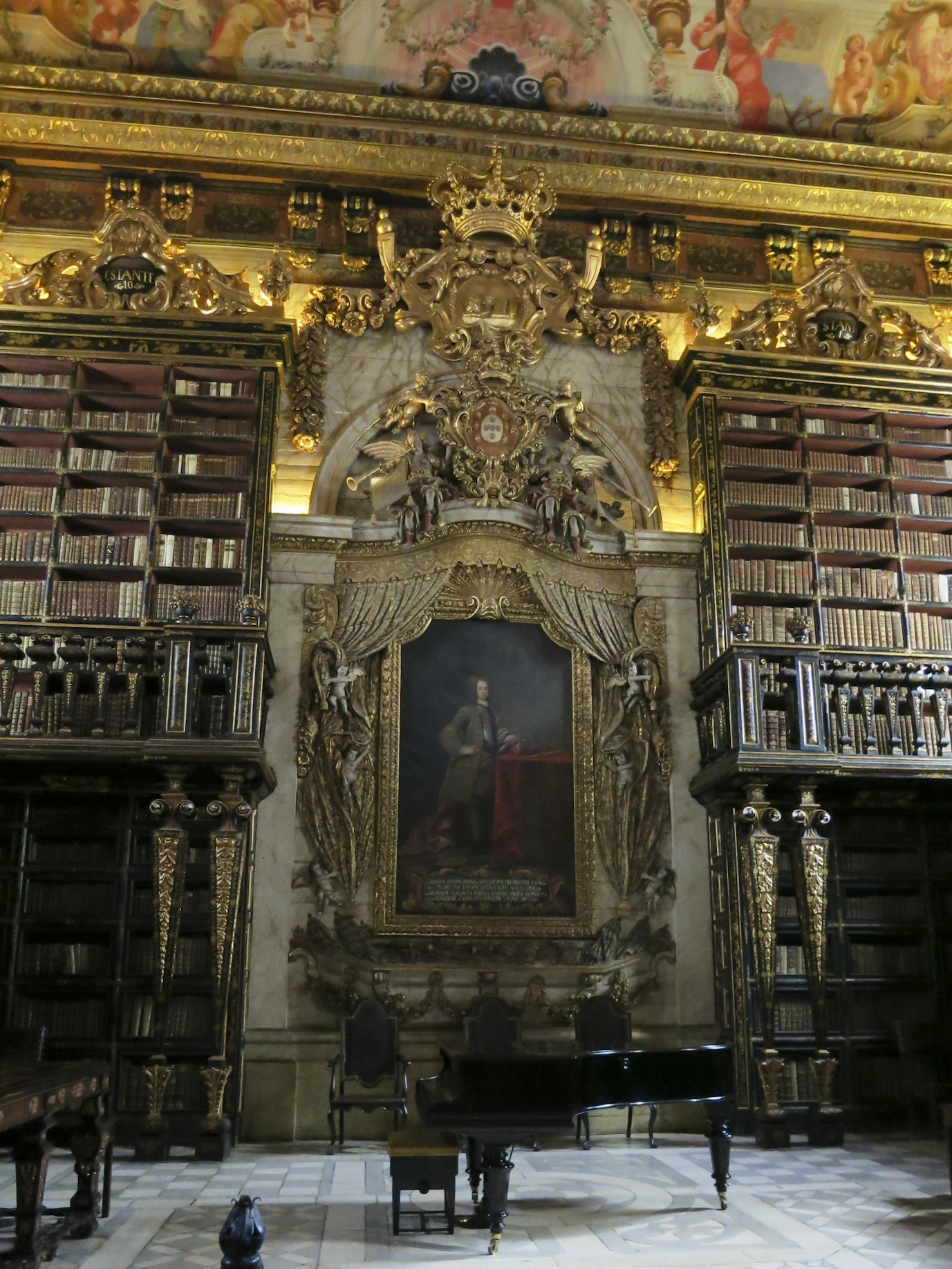
“Talha Dourada” gilded woodcarving. Biblioteca Joanina 1717–1728, University of Coimbra

After the end of the restoration of independence war, and past the crisis of succession between Afonso VI and Pedro II, Portugal was ready for the international Baroque. It started gradually, changing the Mannerist model, trying to animate and modernise the new buildings, using the centred plant and some decoration, such as in the Church of Santa Engrácia in Lisbon, designed by João Nunes Tinoco and João Antunes.

Santa Engrácia is constructed with curves and geometric forms and a centred plant and is crowned by a large dome (completed only in the twentieth century), decorated with colourful marbles and imposing itself to the city.

In the reign of King John V, the Baroque underwent a time of splendour and wealth completely new in Portugal. Despite the destruction wreaked by the 1755 earthquake, several buildings have survived. The Palácio da Ribeira, the Royal Chapel (both destroyed in the earthquake) and the Mafra National Palace, are the main works of the King. The Águas Livres Aqueduct brings water to Lisbon covering a distance of 11.18 miles, with emphasis on the section over the Alcântara valley because of the monumentality of the imposing arches. However, across the country, are still visible marks of the pomp of the time in major or small works.

The gilded woodcarving took on national characteristics because of the significance and richness of the decorations. The painting, sculpture, decorative arts and tiling also experienced great development. One of the most opulent examples of gilded woodcarving from this period, is the Biblioteca Joanina, (Johannine Library, named after King John V) built in the main University of Coimbra old building and tower parade. Numerous less known works exist throughout the country, namely in Viseu, Santarém and Faro.

== Palace of Mafra ==
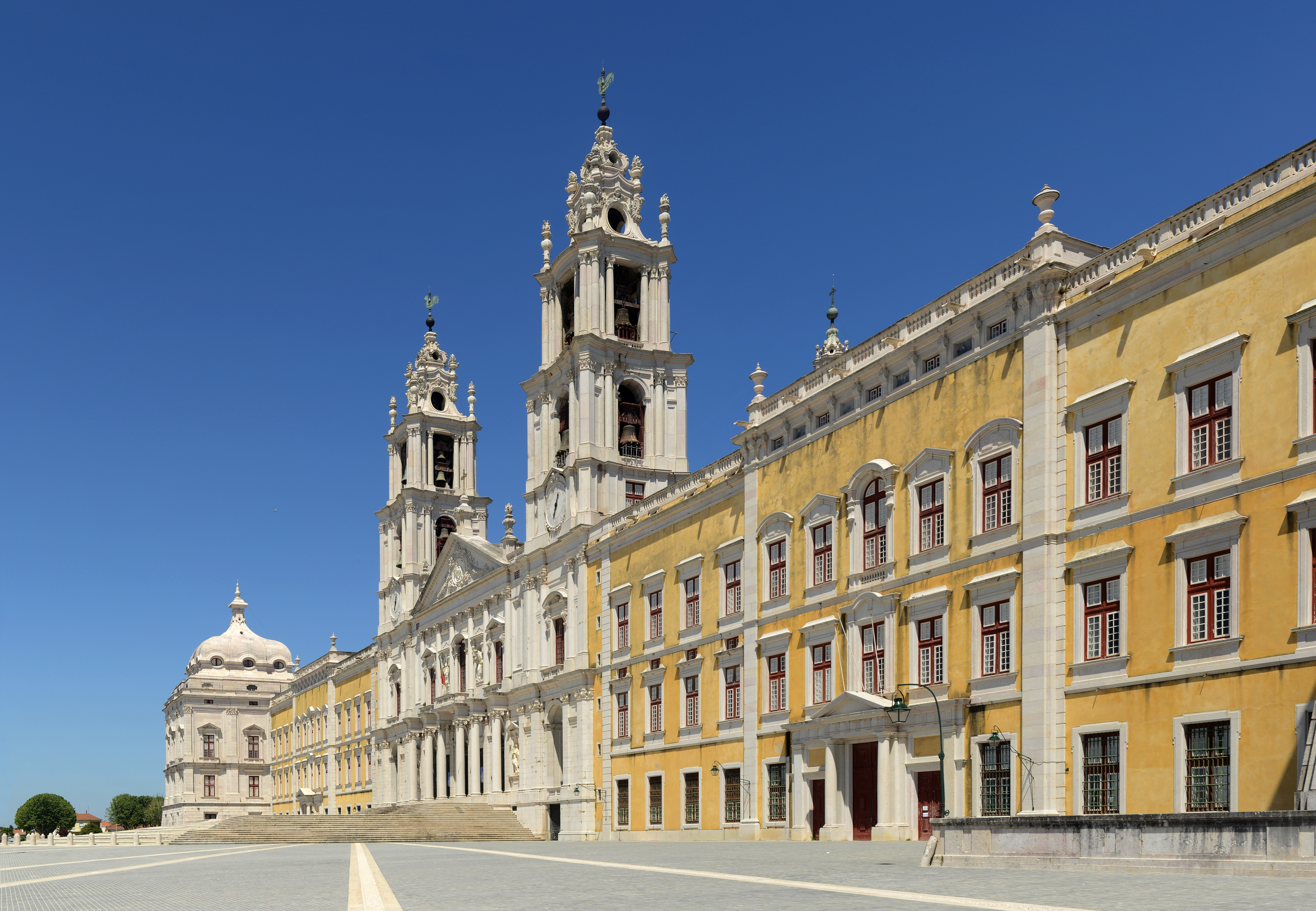
Palace of Mafra, Mafra

The Palace of Mafra is the most international Portuguese Baroque building and, following the fashion among European monarchs, reflects the absolutist architecture, like the Palace of Versailles in France. It is a royal palace, a cathedral and a monastery, built after a promise made by the king related to his succession. Designed by João Frederico Ludovice, a German architect established in Portugal, the work began in 1717 and ended in 1730. It is an immense building with two turrets on the façade, after the destroyed turret in the Ribeira Palace, with the basilica at the centre and two bell towers dominated by an imposing dome. Behind that, although it cannot be seen from the street, is the monastery. The set is visible from the sea, working as a territorial milestone, and used as a summer residence for the court. The king wanted to build a church even greater than the Vatican, but after knowing that it took more than a century, he changed his mind. In the whole complex noteworthy are also the library, the six organs of the basilica and the two carillons.

== Northern Portugal ==
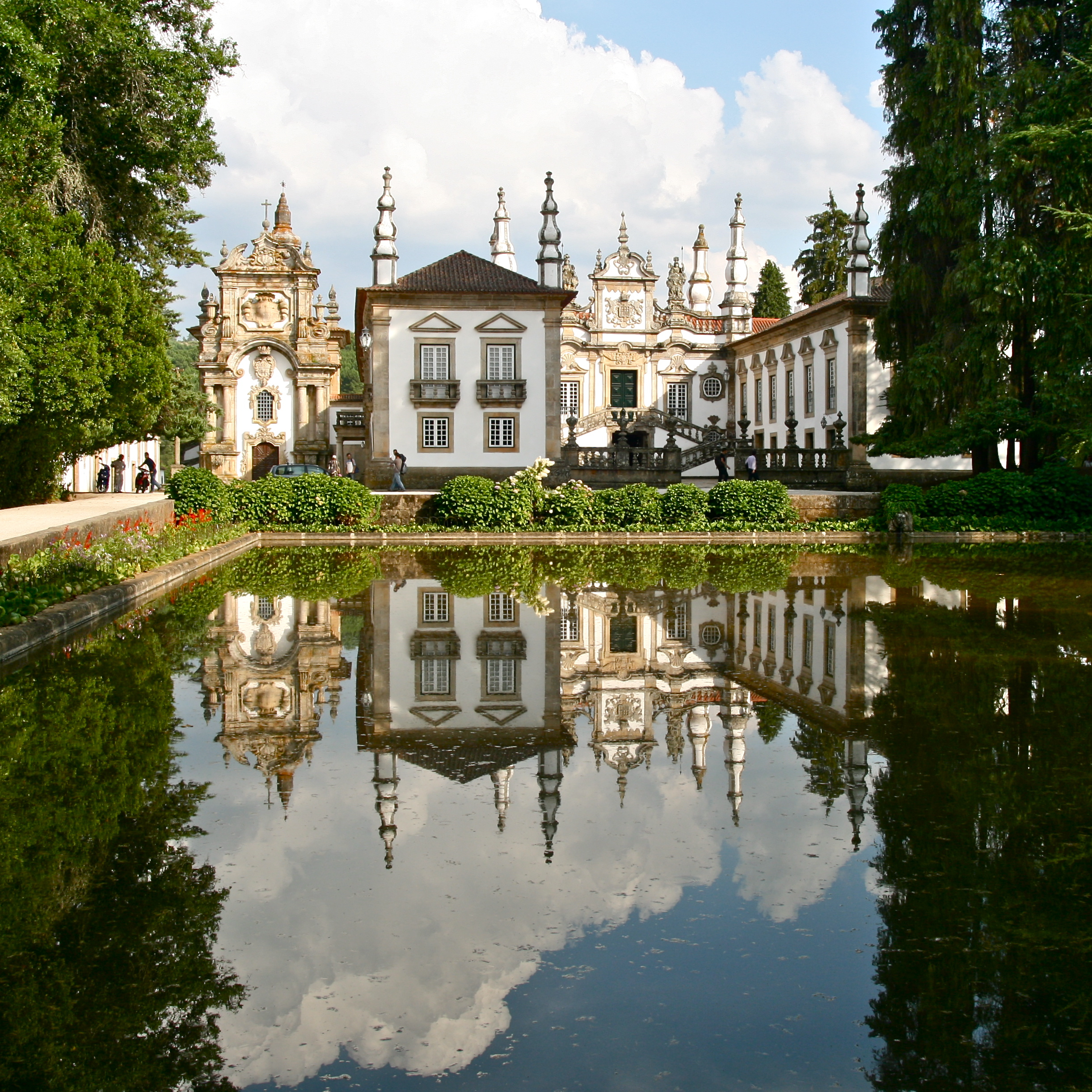
Mateus Palace, one of the best baroque examples in Portugal

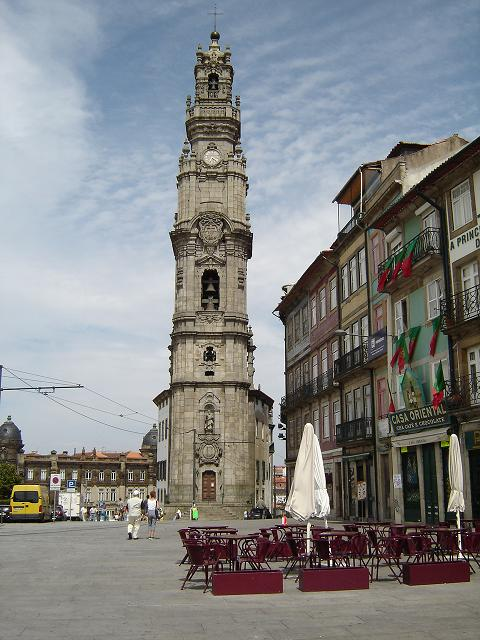
Clérigos Tower

In the north of Portugal there are numerous Baroque buildings. With more inhabitants and better economic resources, the north, particularly the areas of Porto and Braga, witnessed an architectural renewal, visible in the large list of churches, convents and palaces built by the aristocracy.

The city of Porto (classified heritage of humanity by UNESCO) is the city of Baroque in Portugal. It is the working area of Nicolau Nasoni, an Italian architect living in Portugal, drawing original buildings with scenographic emplacement as the church and tower of Clérigos, the logia of the Porto Cathedral, the church of Misericórdia, the Palace of São João Novo, the Palace of Freixo, the Episcopal Palace along with many others.

== See also ==
- Architecture of Portugal
- Baroque in Brazil
- Gilded woodcarving
