= Basilica of Our Lady and Saint Anthony of Mafra =

Roman Catholic basilica

Coordinates: 38.9369°N 9.3264°W

- Basílica de Nossa Senhora e Santo António de Mafra
- Basilica of Our Lady and Saint Anthony of Mafra
- Location: Mafra, Portugal
- Denomination: Roman Catholic Church

History
- Status: Active

Architecture
- Style: Baroque

UNESCO World Heritage Site
- Official name: Royal Building of Mafra – Palace, Basilica, Convent, Cerco Garden and Hunting Park (Tapada)
- Criteria: Cultural: (iv)
- Reference: 1573
- Inscription: 2019 (43rd Session)

Portuguese National Monument
- Type: Non-movable
- Criteria: National Monument
- Designated: 10 January 1907
- Reference no.: IPA.00006381

The Basilica of Our Lady and Saint Anthony of Mafra is a Roman Catholic shrine and basilica located within the Palace of Mafra, Portugal. The shrine is dedicated to the Blessed Virgin Mary and Saint Anthony of Padua and once fostered religious devotion among the Portuguese nobility. The Basilica enshrines several Baroque artworks and Christian relics from various European kings collected in Portugal over the centuries. It also serves as the main headquarters the Royal and Venerable Confraternity of the Most Blessed Sacrament of Mafra.

The basilica was designated as a “National Monument” in 1910. Since 7 July 2019, the basilica as part of other surroundings was declared a UNESCO World Heritage Site. It is designated as a Basilica by the privilege of immemorial status.

== History ==
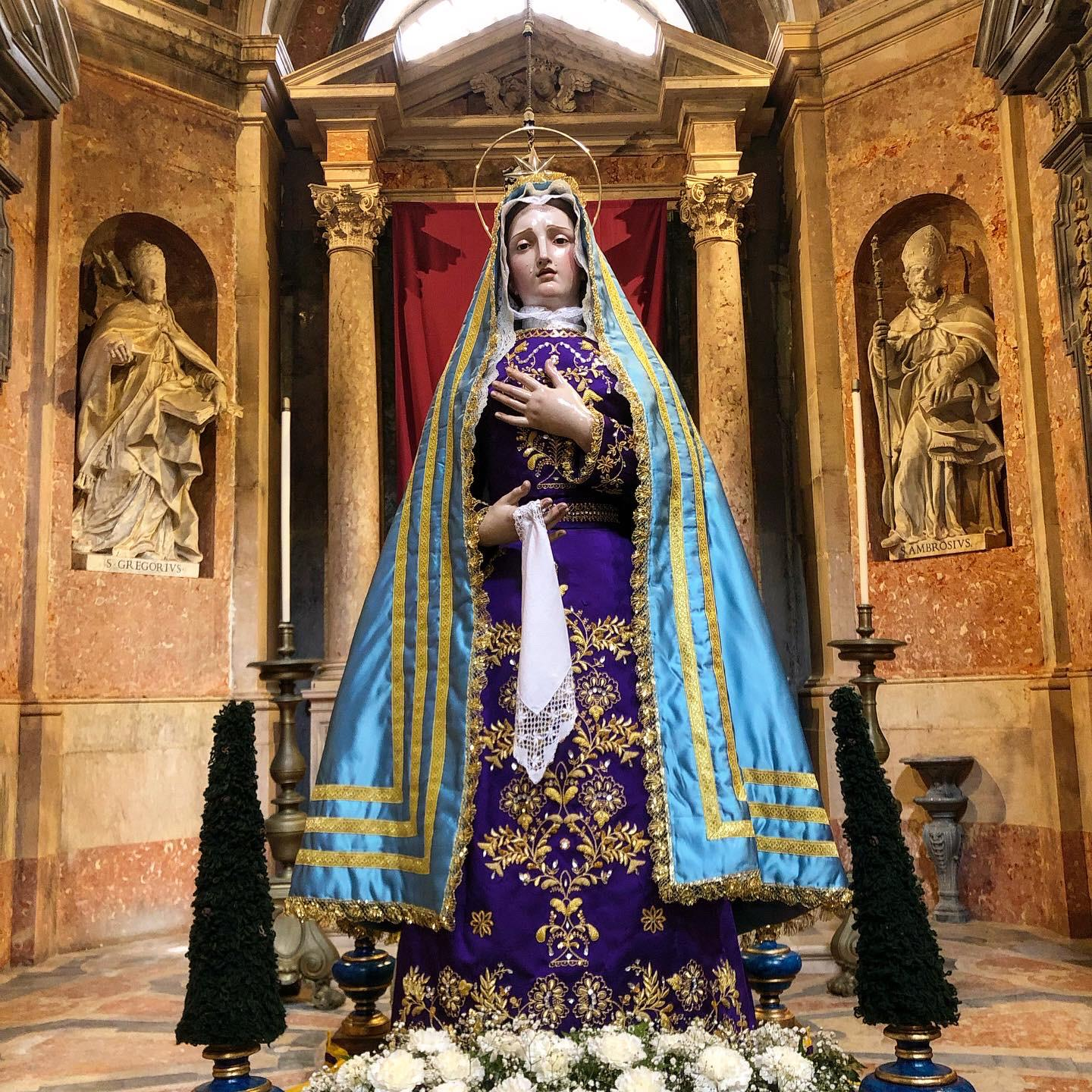
The 1773 image of the dolorous Virgin, granted a decree of Pontifical coronation by Pope Francis in 2020.

The church is built in the cruciform of a Latin cross with a length of 63 m. It is rather narrow (16.5 m), an impression accentuated by the height of its nave (21.5 m). The vestibule (Galilee porch) contains a group of large sculptures in Carrara marble, representing the patron saints of several monastic orders.

The interior makes abundantly use of local rose-coloured marble, intermingled with white marble in different patterns. The multi-coloured designs of the floor are repeated on the ceiling. The barrel vault rests on fluted Corinthian semicolumns standing between the side chapels. The chapels in the transept contain altarpieces in jasper made by sculptors from the School of Mafra. The side aisles display 58 marble statues commissioned from the best Roman sculptors of their time. The Most Blessed Sacrament's chapel in the transept is screened from the crossing by iron railings with bronze ornaments, made in Antwerp.

The choir has an intricate giant candleholder with seven lamps sprouting from the mouth of seven rolled-up snakes. Above the main altar, inserting into the ceiling, is a gigantic jasper crucifix of 4.2 m, flanked by two kneeling angels, made by the School of Mafra. The cupola over the crossing was also inspired by the cupola of Sant'Agnese in Agone (by the Roman Baroque architect Francesco Borromini). This 70 m-high cupola with a small lantern atop, is carried by four finely sculpted arcs in rose and white marble.

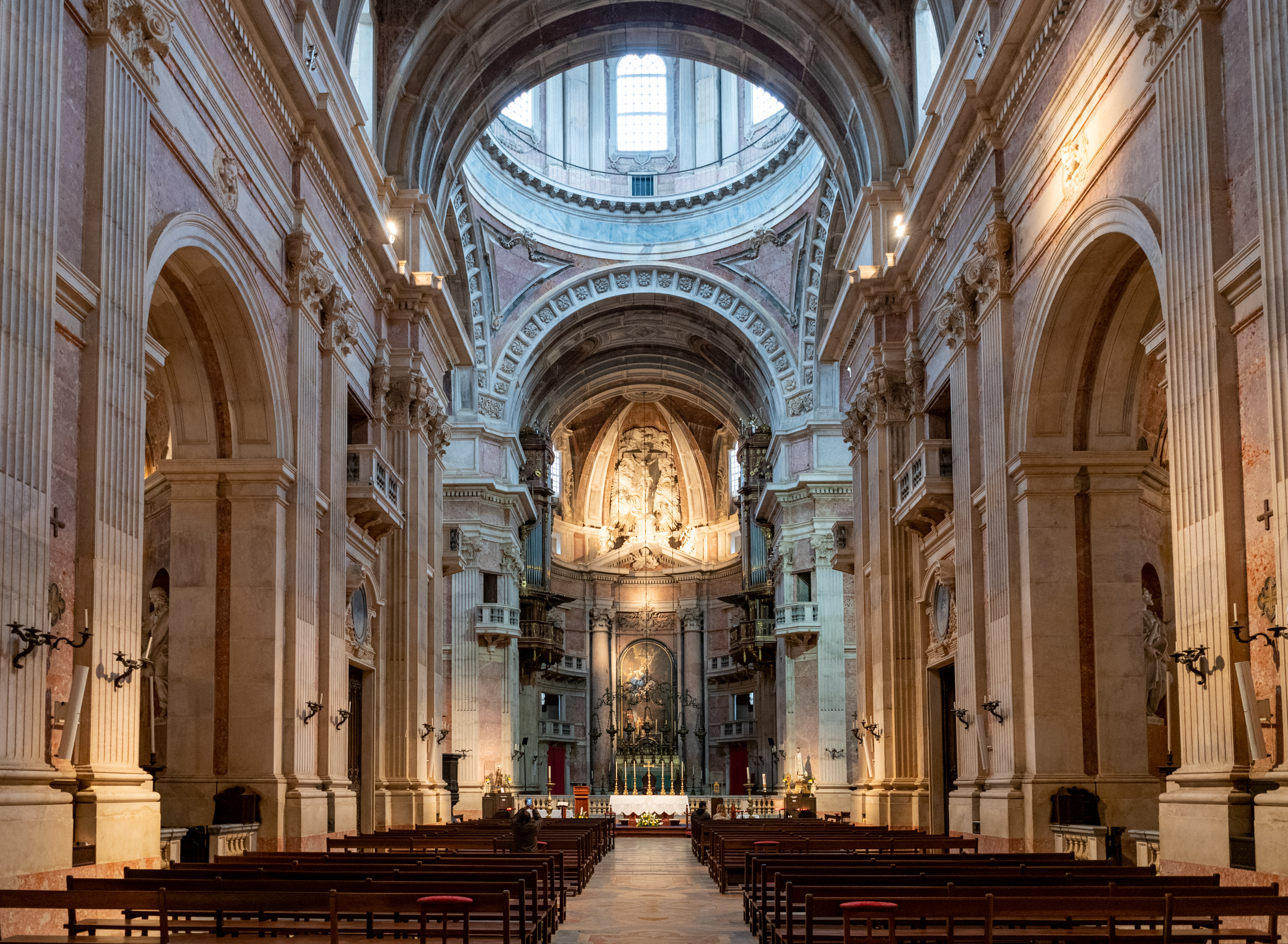
Principal nave of the Basilica.

There are six organs, four of which are located in the transept, constituting a rather uncommon ensemble. There were built by Joaquim Peres Fontanes and António Xavier Machado Cerveira between 1792 and 1807 (when the French troops occupied Mafra). They were made out of partially gilded Brazilian wood. The largest pipe is 6 m high and has a diameter of 0.28 m. King John V had commissioned liturgical vestments from master embroiderers from Genoa and Milan, such as Giuliano Saturni and Benedetto Salandri, and from France. They attest of superb quality and workmanship by their embroidering in gold technique and the use of silk thread in the same colour.

== Notable artwork ==
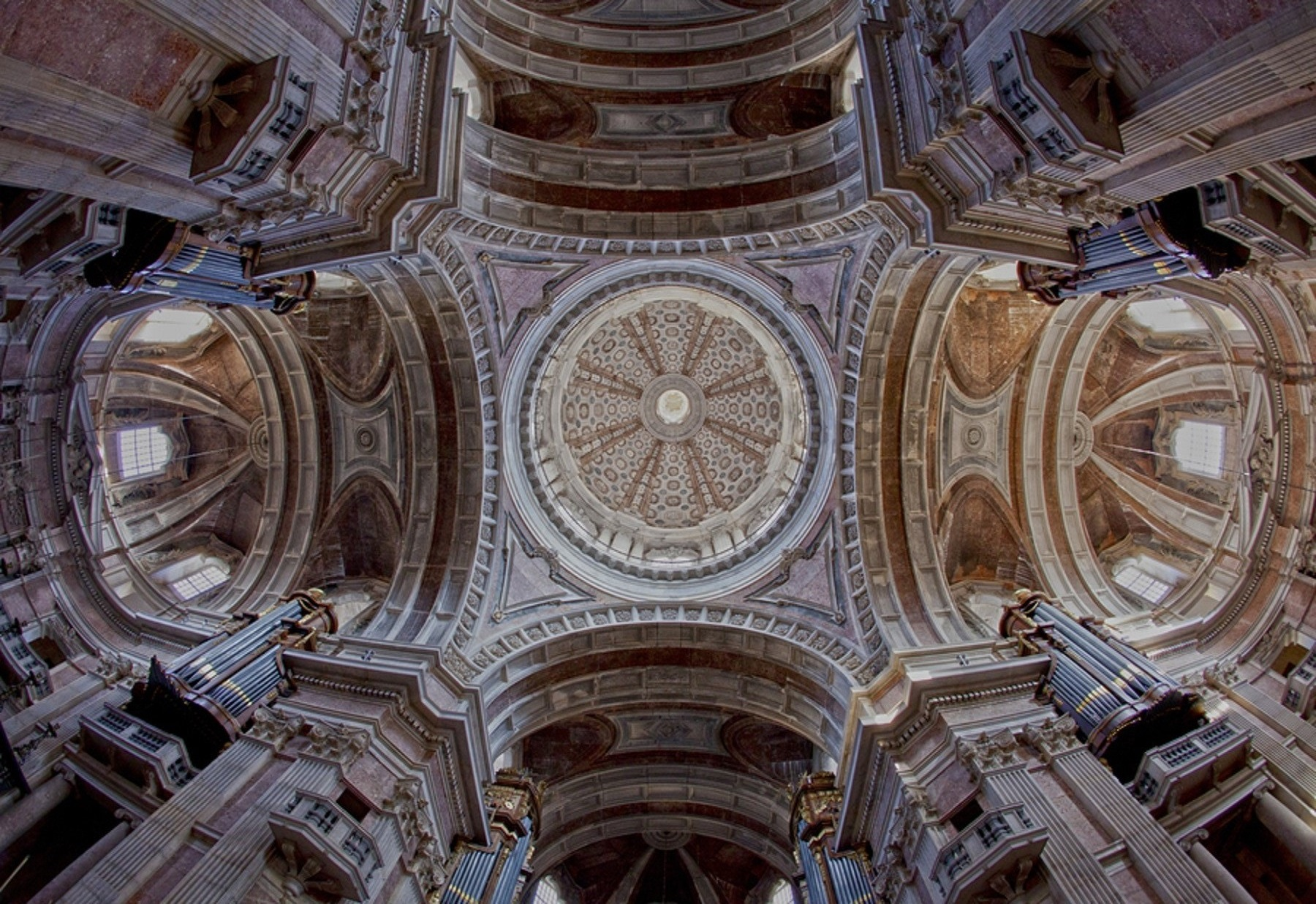
The grand Cupola of the basilica.

The religious paintings in the basilica and the convent constitute one of the most significant 18th century collections in Portugal. They include works by the Italians Agostino Masucci, Corrado Giaquinto, Francesco Trevisani, Pompeo Batoni and some Portuguese students in Rome such as Vieira Lusitano and Inácio de Oliveira Bernardes. The sculpture collection contains works by almost every major Roman sculptor from the first half of the 18th century. At that time, it represented the biggest single order done by a foreign power in Rome and still is amongst the biggest collections in existence.

== Institutions ==
The Royal and Venerable Confraternity of the Most Blessed Sacrament of Mafra (Portuguese: Real e Venerável Irmandade do Santíssimo Sacramento de Mafra) have their headquarters within the Basilica.

Pope Francis granted a Pontifical decree of canonical coronation to the dolorous image of the Blessed Virgin Mary venerated under the title of Our Lady of Solitude in 10 November 2020. The rite of coronation was executed by the former Archivist of the Holy Roman Church, Cardinal José Tolentino de Mendonça on 17 September 2023.

== See also ==
- Palace of Mafra
- Organ of the basilica of the Palace of Mafra
- Mafra carillons
- Royal and Venerable Confraternity of the Most Blessed Sacrament of Mafra
