= Igreja de Santo André =

Igreja de Santo André may refer to:

- Igreja de Santo André (Mafra), a church in Portugal
- Igreja de Santo André (Vila Boa de Quires), a church in Portugal
