= Maricel =

Maricel is a masculine or feminine given name. According to Meaning Names, its biblical definition means "He who raises" in Hebrew. Also, the hispanic name is a compound of María and Celia. The name is similar to Marisol and Marcela.

Notable people with the name include:

- Maricel also Maricel Ioris (born in Curitiba-PR) brazilian singer, songwriter and actress
- Maricel Laxa (born 1970), Filipina comedian and actress
- Maricel Presilla (living), American chef, culinary historian and author
- Maricel Soriano (born 1965), Filipina film and television actress
- Maricel Voinea (born 1959), Romanian team handball player and coach

== See also ==
- Maricel Museum, a museum located in the centre of Sitges, Catalonia, Spain
