= Friday of Sorrows =

Solemn remembrance in Catholic Lent

Friday of Sorrows Viernes de Dolores
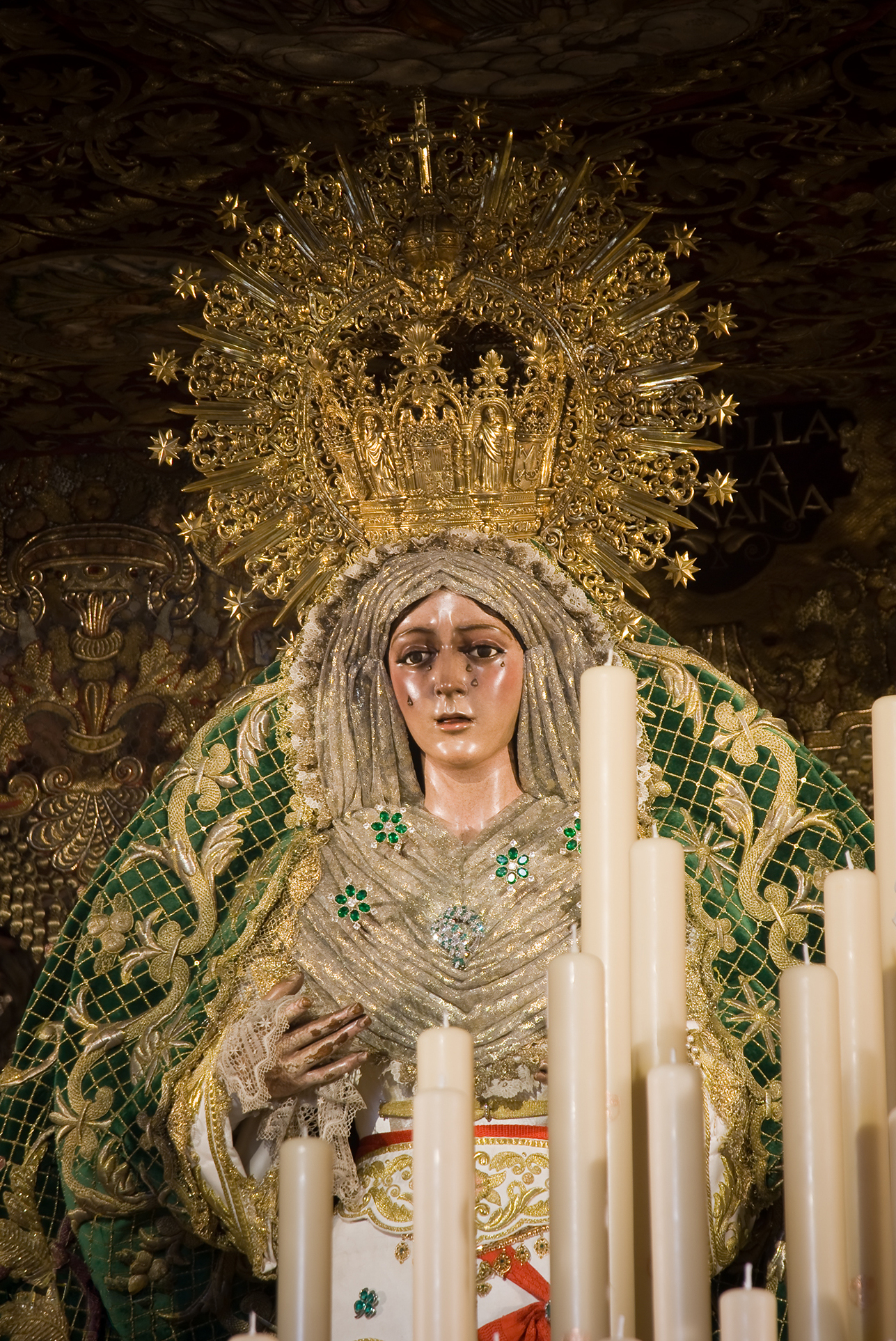
- Regarded as the most famous in Spain during Holy Week processions, the Virgin of Hope of Macarena, shown in her sorrowful theme while wearing imperial regalia each Friday before Palm Sunday.
- Also called: Council Friday
- Observed by: Catholic Church (Mexico, Guatemala, Italy, Peru, Brazil, Spain, Malta, Luxembourg and the Philippines)
- Date: Friday before Palm Sunday
- 2026 date: March 27
- 2027 date: March 19
- 2028 date: April 7
- Frequency: Annual

The Friday of Sorrows or Passion Friday is a solemn pious memorial of the dolorous Blessed Virgin Mary on the Friday before Palm Sunday held in the fifth week of Lent (formerly called "Passion Week"). It takes place exactly one week before Good Friday, and focuses on the shared emotional pain and Passion of Jesus Christ that was supernaturally endured by his mother, the Blessed Virgin Mary, who is venerated under the title Our Lady of Sorrows.

In certain Catholic countries, especially Brazil, Guatemala, Italy, Luxembourg, Malta, Mexico, Peru, the Philippines, and Spain, it is the official beginning of Holy Week celebrations and often termed Viernes de Dolores ("Friday of Sorrows") or a similar local name.

In certain Spanish-speaking countries, the day is also referred to as "Council Friday", because of John 11:47–54 as the Gospel of the day in the Tridentine Mass (now read in slightly expanded form the next day, i.e., Saturday of the fifth week of Lent), which recounts the meeting of the Sanhedrin priests to discuss the arrest and punishment of Jesus. A similar commemoration in sympathy with the Virgin Mary under the title of Our Lady of Solitude is held on Black Saturday.

Among Catholic converts belonging to the Anglican Ordinariate, it is called Saint Mary in Passiontide and sometimes it is traditionally known as Our Lady in Passiontide.

== Historicity ==
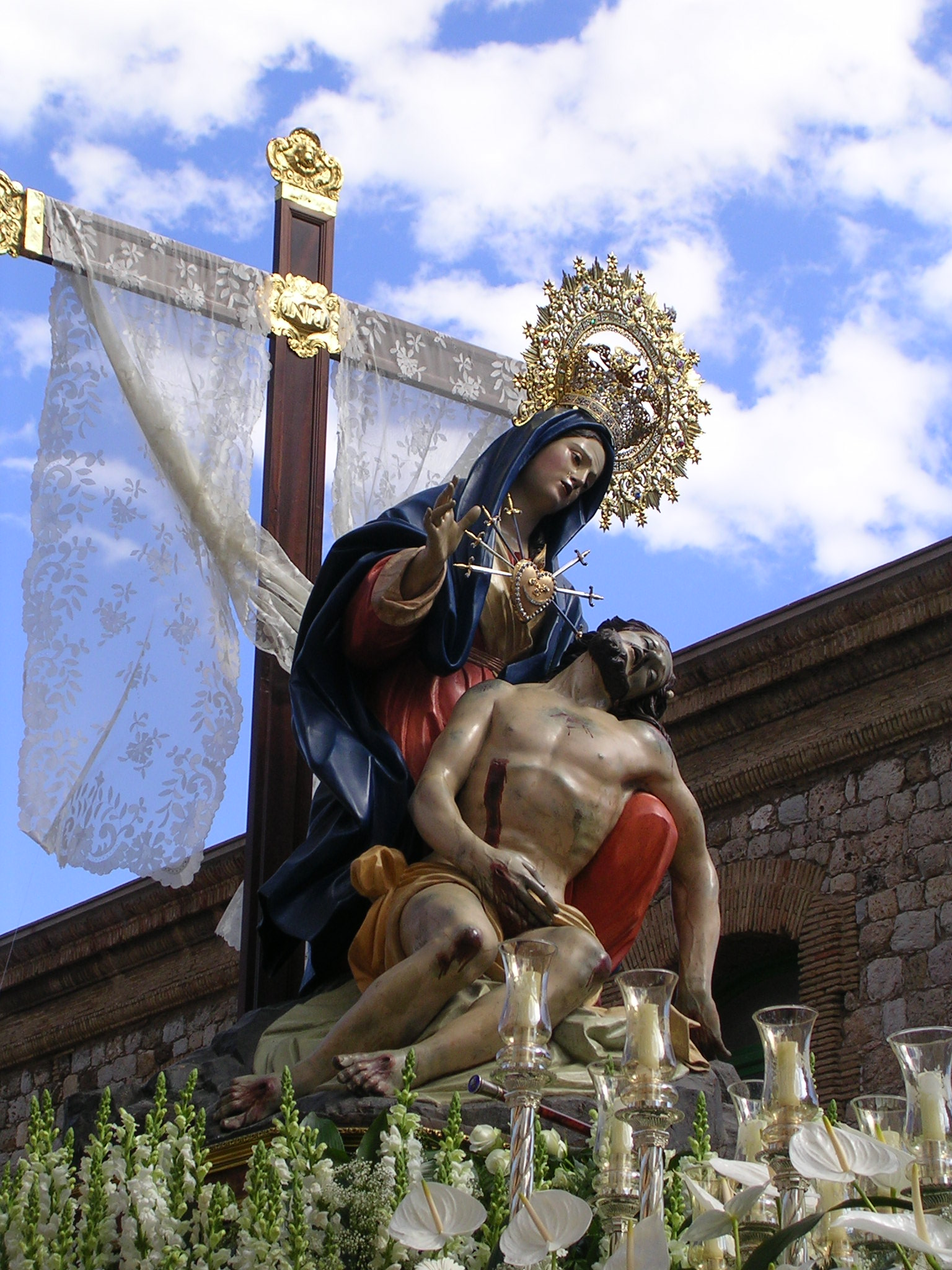
The Virgin of Charity (1723) celebrated in Cartagena, Spain during the Friday of Sorrows

The first liturgical celebrations for the sorrowful Mary, the Feast of Our Lady of Charity (Our Lady of Compassion), occurred in the 15th century. In 1668, the Order of Servites were granted permission for a votive Mass to the Seven Sorrows of Mary.

This pious traditionalist belief advocates that the Blessed Virgin Mary implored God the Father to mutually feel and experience the pain and Passion of Jesus Christ, which was granted to her mind and heart beginning at the entrance of her Son into the city of Jerusalem (Palm Sunday) up until the death of Christ at Mount Calvary (Good Friday).

Pope Innocent XII in 1692 locally authorized in Rome the celebration of a feast in honor of Our Lady on the third Sunday of September; which was later transferred to the present date of the Friday before Palm Sunday.

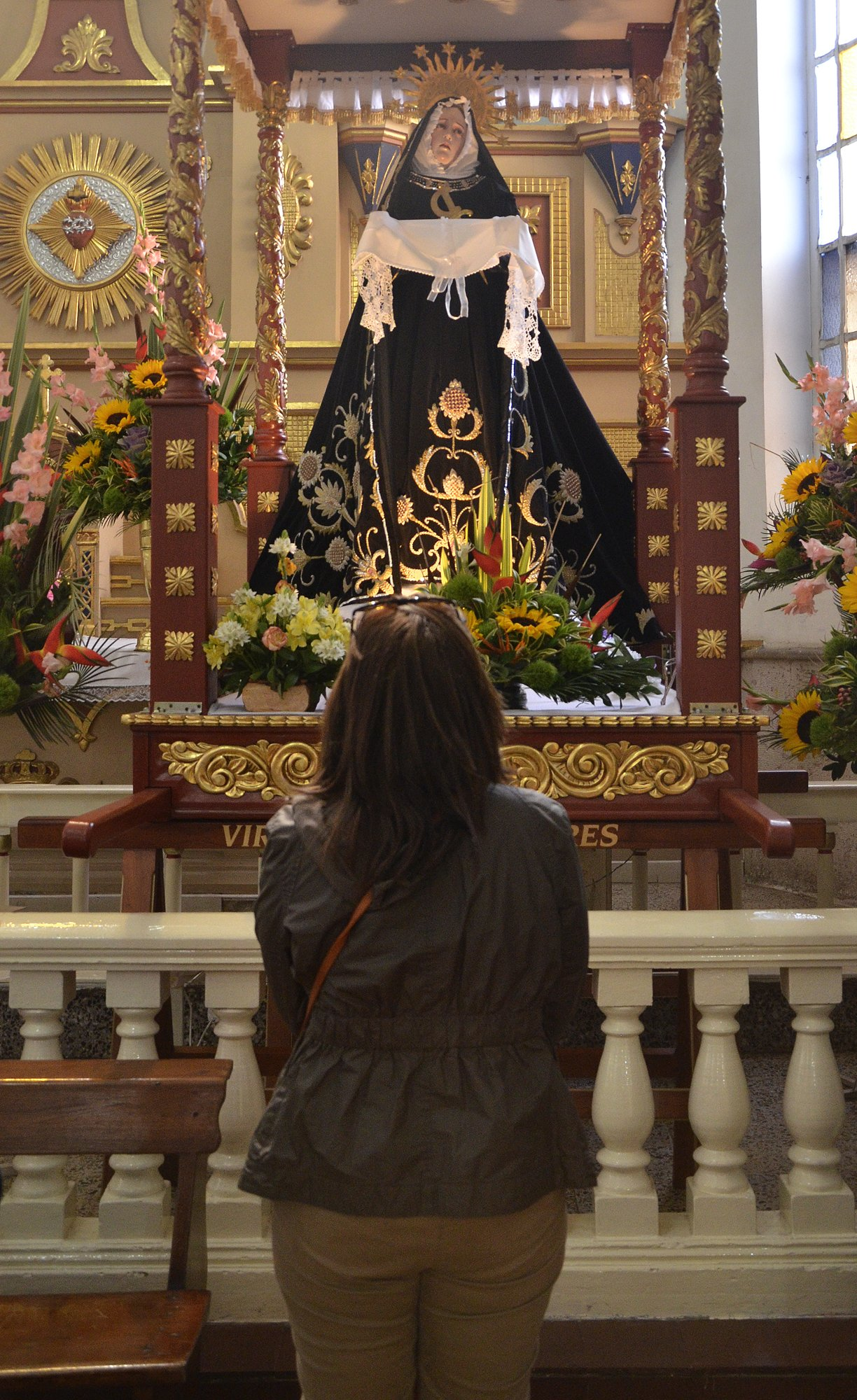
Memorial and veneration of the Dolorous Virgin in Chía, Colombia

Pope Benedict XIII issued a decree in 22 April 1727 which extended the Feast of Our Lady of Charity (also called "Our Lady of Compassion"), commemorating the sorrowful Virgin, to the entire Latin Church and its calendar, retaining celebration on the Friday of the Passion week.

By the Marian year of 1954, the feast still held the rank of major double (slightly lower in rank than the Feast of the Seven Sorrows of the Blessed Virgin Mary on 15 September) in the General Roman Calendar.

Pope John XXIII's 1960 Code of Rubrics reduced it to the level of a commemoration. Following the modernization reforms of the Second Vatican Council, the Friday of Sorrows was deleted in 1969 from the General Roman Calendar as a duplicate of the 15 September feast. Each of the two celebrations had been called a feast of "The Seven Sorrows of the Blessed Virgin Mary" (Latin: Septem Dolorum Beatae Mariae Virginis) and included the Stabat Mater as a sequence of the Mass. Since then, the 15 September feast combines and continues both is known as the Feast of Our Lady of Sorrows (Latin: Beatae Mariae Virginis Perdolentis), and recitation of the Stabat Mater is optional.

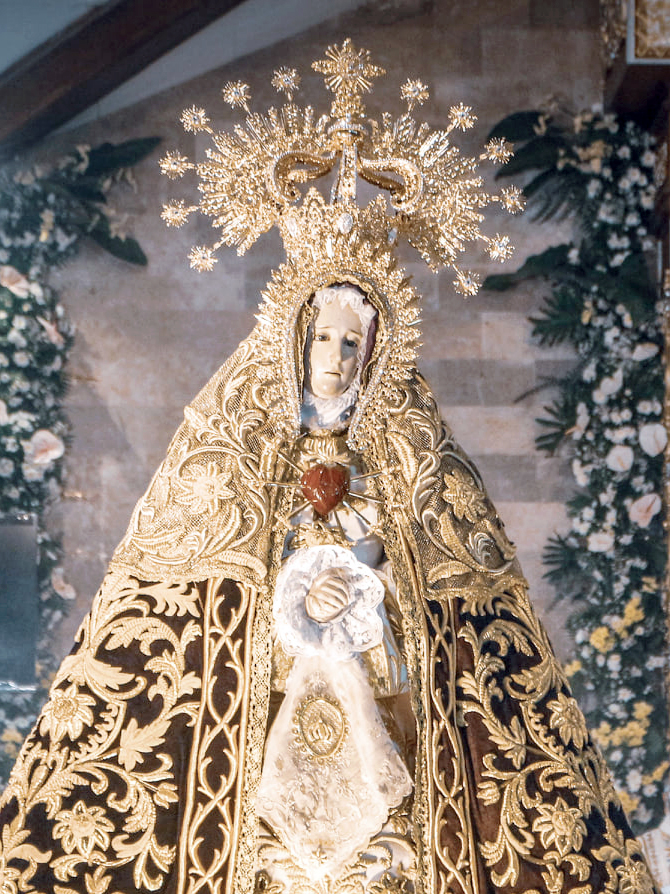
An image of the dolorous Virgin in Dolores, Quezon

Observance of the feast according to the 1960 calendar is still the case in Traditionalist Catholicism, and even where the 1969 calendar is used, some countries have kept the commemoration in their national calendars. The 2002 edition of the Roman Missal also provides an alternative collect for this Friday.

In the 1962 Roman Missal, the last edition of the Tridentine Missal and published under John XXIII, the day’s Collect was as follows:

O God, in whose Passion, according to the prophecy of Simeon, the sword of sorrow didst pierce the most sweet soul of the glorious Mary, Virgin and Mother; mercifully grant that we who call to mind with veneration her anguish and suffering, by the glorious merits and prayers of all the Saints who faithfully stood beneath the Cross interceding for us, may obtain the blessed fruit of Thy Passion, Thou Who livest and reigneth with God the Father, in the unity of the Holy Ghost, one God, world without end. Amen.

In 2015, Divine Worship: The Missal for Anglican Use Catholics restored the observance on the Friday in Passion Week, and provided propers including the Introit Stabant iuxta crucem (Jn 19:25; Ps 56:1), and a modified form of the 1962 Collect:

O Lord, in whose Passion, according to the prophecy of Simeon, the sword of sorrow did pierce the most loving soul of thy glorious Virgin Mother Mary: mercifully grant that we, who devoutly call to mind the suffering whereby she was pierced, may, by the glorious merits and prayers of all the Saints who have stood beneath the Cross, obtain with gladness the benefits of thy Passion; who livest and reignest with the Father, in the unity of the Holy Spirit, ever one God, world without end. Amen.

It also restored the following Gradual:

- Dolorosa et Lacrimabilis
- the Tract Stabat Sancta Maria (Cf. Lam 1:12)
- the Sequence Stabat Mater Dolorosa
- the Offertory Recordare, Virgo Mater (Cf. Jer 18:20)
- the Communion Felices sensus Beatæ Mariæ among other requisite proper prayers.

Pope Benedict XVI's decree Summorum Pontificum Cura authorizes, under certain conditions, continued use of the 1962 Roman Missal, which has this feast on the Friday of the fifth week of Lent.

The Spaniard Abbess Mary of Jesus of Agreda and German stigmatist Blessed Anne Catherine Emmerich were notable proponents of this belief purported to be revealed in their Marian apparitions. The latter being referenced through the controversial writings of Clemens Maria Brentano after Emmerich’s death.

== National customs ==
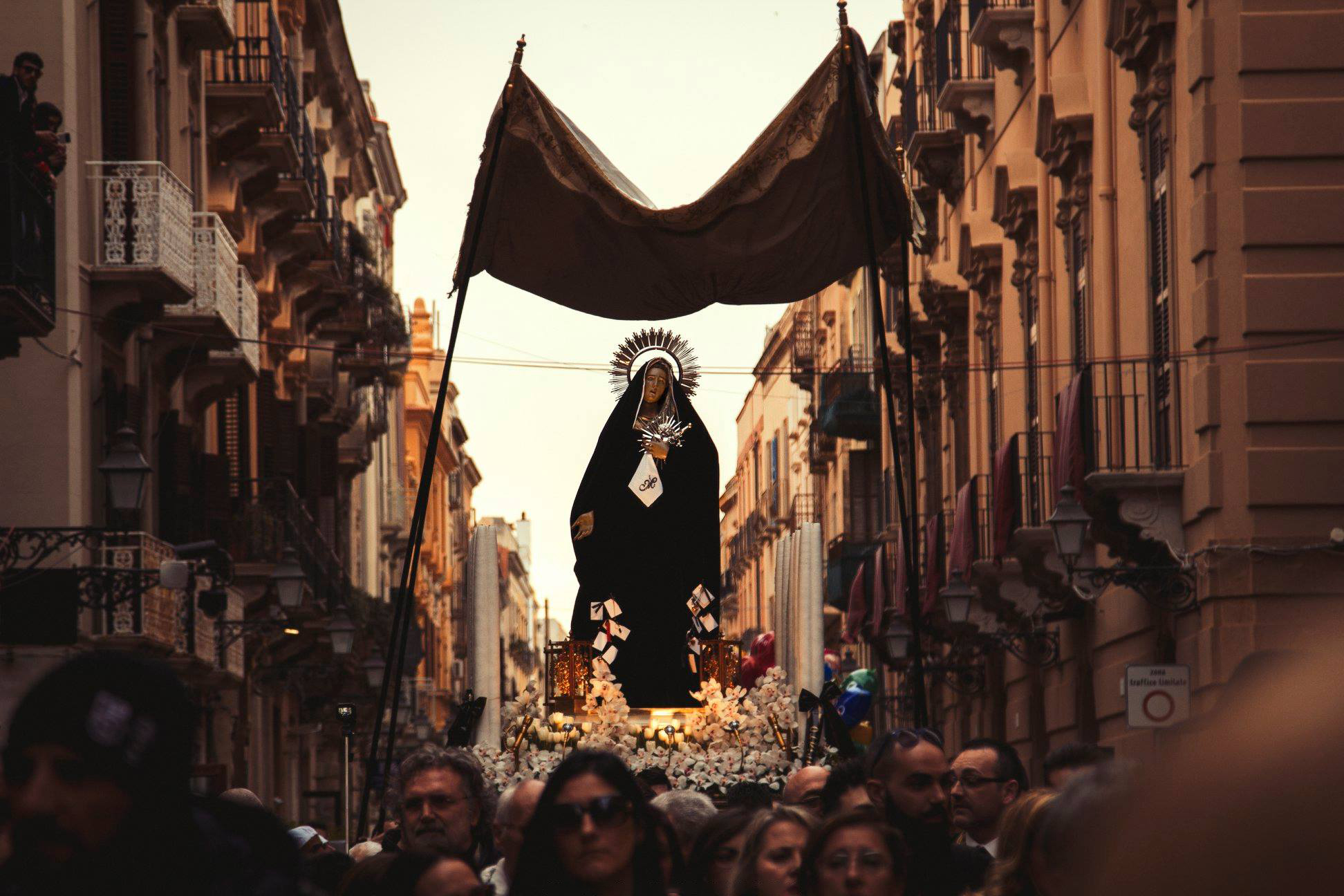
L'Addolorata (Our Lady of Sorrows) in procession during the Misteri di Trapani in Sicily, Italy

Celebrations of Friday of Sorrows in Colombia, Costa Rica, Ecuador, Guatemala, Malta, Mexico, Peru, the Philippines, Portugal, and Venezuela include processions, public penance, mournful singing, and mortification of the flesh. Other activities include singing the Stabat Mater and candlelight vigils.

In Italy, the day is called La Festa della Addolorata and processions use famous Baroque images made in the area of Naples.

In Malta, Holy Week activities commence on this day, with the statue of Our Lady of Sorrows carried in procession through the streets of the capital, Valletta. Many other towns and villages hold similar processions.

In Mexico, people make small shrines of the Virgen de Dolores in their homes and decorate these with candles, wheatgrass and oranges.

In the Philippines, the day’s highlight is a torchlit procession featuring statues of Christ, Our Lady of Sorrows, and other saints. Some families and communities also start the days-long, uninterrupted chanting or Pabasa (“reading”) of the Pasióng Mahál, a vernacular epic retelling the Passion of Jesus and Biblical events. Penitents, with veiled faces to signify humility, begin self-flagellation and carrying of crosses as their annual sacrifices.

In Spain, the namesake procession with a statue of Our Lady is held on Viernes de los Dolores preceding Palm Sunday, with a fair featuring local cuisine.

In Portugal, it is celebrated by the Royal and Venerable Confraternity of the Most Blessed Sacrament of Mafra.

In the Duchy of Luxembourg, pious women make expiatory prayers accompanied by religious processions honoring the Virgin under this title. The public also prepare food and pastries for the occasion, which is widely considered a Family Day.

== Related titles ==
There are a number of titles relates to Our Lady of Sorrows associated to various observances during Passiontide.

- Nuestra Señora de la Soledad

== See also ==
- Holy Week
- Stabat Mater
- Virgin of Hope of Macarena

== Bibliography ==
- Brugada Martirià. La Virgen de los Dolores: Always at his side, Ed Centre for Pastoral Liturgy, Barcelona 2002, collection Saints and Santas n. 71 (version in Catalan and Spanish)
