= Soledad =

Soledad, Spanish for "solitude", often refers to María de la Soledad (Our Lady of Solitude), a title of Mary the mother of Jesus in Roman Catholic tradition and a form of devotion.

Soledad may refer to:

== People ==
- Chalon people or Soledad, a Native American people and language of Salinas Valley, California
- Shalani Soledad (born 1980), Filipina politician and TV personality
- Soledad Alvear (born 1950), Chilean politician
- Soledad Bravo (born 1943), Venezuelan singer
- Soledad Brothers, three African-American inmates, including George Jackson, involved in a notable row
- Soledad Chacón (1890–1936), American politician
- Soledad Florendo (born 1903, date of death unknown), Filipino physician
- Soledad Gallego-Díaz (born 1951), Spanish journalist
- Soledad Miranda (1943–1970), Spanish actress
- Soledad O'Brien (born 1966), American broadcast journalist and executive producer
- Soledad Pastorutti (born 1980), Argentine folklore singer
- Soledad Rosas (1974–1998), Argentine anarchist
- Soledad Salvador (1957–1985), Filipino religious worker and activist
- Soledad Sevilla (born 1944) Spanish painter

== Places ==
- Soledad, Atlántico, Colombia, a municipality
- La Soledad, Tamaulipas, a city in the 836 area code of Mexico
- Soledad, a barrio in Consolación del Sur, Cuba
- La Soledad, Panama, a corregimiento
- Soledad, San Jose, Camarines Sur, Philippines, a barangay (village)
- Soledad, California, United States, a city
- Mount Soledad, a small mountaintop located in the La Jolla area of San Diego, California

== Music ==
- "Soledad", a song by Amaral from Salto al color
- "Soledad", a musical piece by Astor Piazzolla
- "Soledad", a song by Carlos Gardel
- "Soledad", a song by Don Omar from the 2015 album The Last Don 2
- "Soledad", a song by Emilio José, a 1973 number-one single in Spain
- "Soledad", a song by Eric Burdon and Jimmy Witherspoon from Guilty!
- "Soledad", a song by La Oreja de Van Gogh from El viaje de Copperpot
- "Soledad", a song by Maná from Falta Amor
- "Soledad", a song by Mano Negra from Puta's Fever
- "Soledad", a song by Westlife from Coast to Coast
- "La Soledad", a song by Pink Martini from Sympathique
- "La Soledad", a Spanish-language version of the song "La solitudine" by Laura Pausini

== Film and television ==
- Soledad (TV series), a 1980 Mexican telenovela
- Soledad (2001 TV series), a Peruvian telenovela starring Coraima Torres and Guillermo Pérez
- Solitary Fragments (Spanish title La soledad), a 2007 Spanish film by Jaime Rosales
- La Soledad (film), a 2016 Venezuelan film by Jorge Thielen Armand

== Other uses ==
- Fort Soledad, Guam
- Mission Nuestra Señora de la Soledad, California, a Spanish mission colloquially known as Soledad Mission
- Soledad State Prison, Soledad, California
- Soledad (novel), a 2001 novel by Angie Cruz
- Soledad International Airport

== See also ==
- Soledad Atzompa, Veracruz, Mexico
- Soledad de Doblado, Veracruz, Mexico
- Soledades, a poem by Luis de Góngora
