= Royal and Venerable Confraternity of the Most Blessed Sacrament of Mafra =

Coordinates: 38°56′13.8″N 9°19′31.9″W

- Real e Venerável Irmandade do Santíssimo Sacramento de Mafra
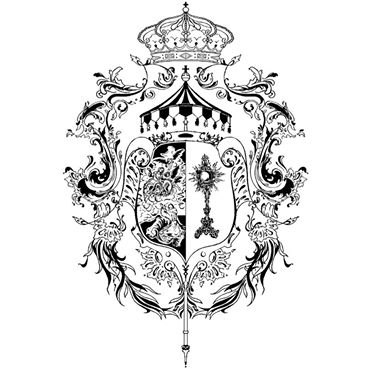
- Emblem of the Confraternity
- Abbreviation: RVISSM
- Formation: 16th century
- Type: Catholic public association
- Headquarters: Basilica of Our Lady and Saint Anthony of Mafra, Mafra, Portugal

The Royal and Venerable Confraternity of the Most Blessed Sacrament of Mafra, alternatively, the Royal and Venerable Brotherhood of the Most Blessed Sacrament of Mafra (Portuguese: Real e Venerável Irmandade do Santíssimo Sacramento de Mafra), is a public association of faithful of the Catholic Church, canonically established in the Basilica of Our Lady and Saint Anthony of Mafra, Portugal.

The confraternity is one of the oldest institutions in the municipality of Mafra. It organizes the Corpus Christi solemnity and organizes the four traditional processions of the season of Lent in Mafra:

- The procession of the Passion of the Lord (Portuguese: Procissão do Senhor Jesus dos Passos);
- The procession of Penance of the Third Order of Saint Francis (Portuguese: Procissão de Penitência da Ordem Terceira de São Francisco);
- The procession of Seven Sorrows of Our Lady (Portuguese: Procissão das Sete Dores de Nossa Senhora); and
- The procession of the Burial of the Lord (Portuguese: Procissão do Enterro do Senhor).

Over time, the confraternity has been the custodian of several relics. Those include Louis XV's coronation shirt, which he wore for the ceremony in Reims Cathedral.

The confraternity also holds the largest collection of processional mannequin-style images (Portuguese: imagens de vestir or imagens de roca) in the country. Some of these are still used for religious processions.

Part of the confraternity ceremonies and religious functions take place with the sound of the basilica's six historical pipe organs and two Mafra carillons.

It is a Catholic institution with a traditionalist tendency. On November 4, 2017, the brotherhood promoted the visit to Mafra of the conservative Cardinal Raymond Leo Burke, known for being an opponent of Pope Francis and supporter of Donald Trump.

== History ==
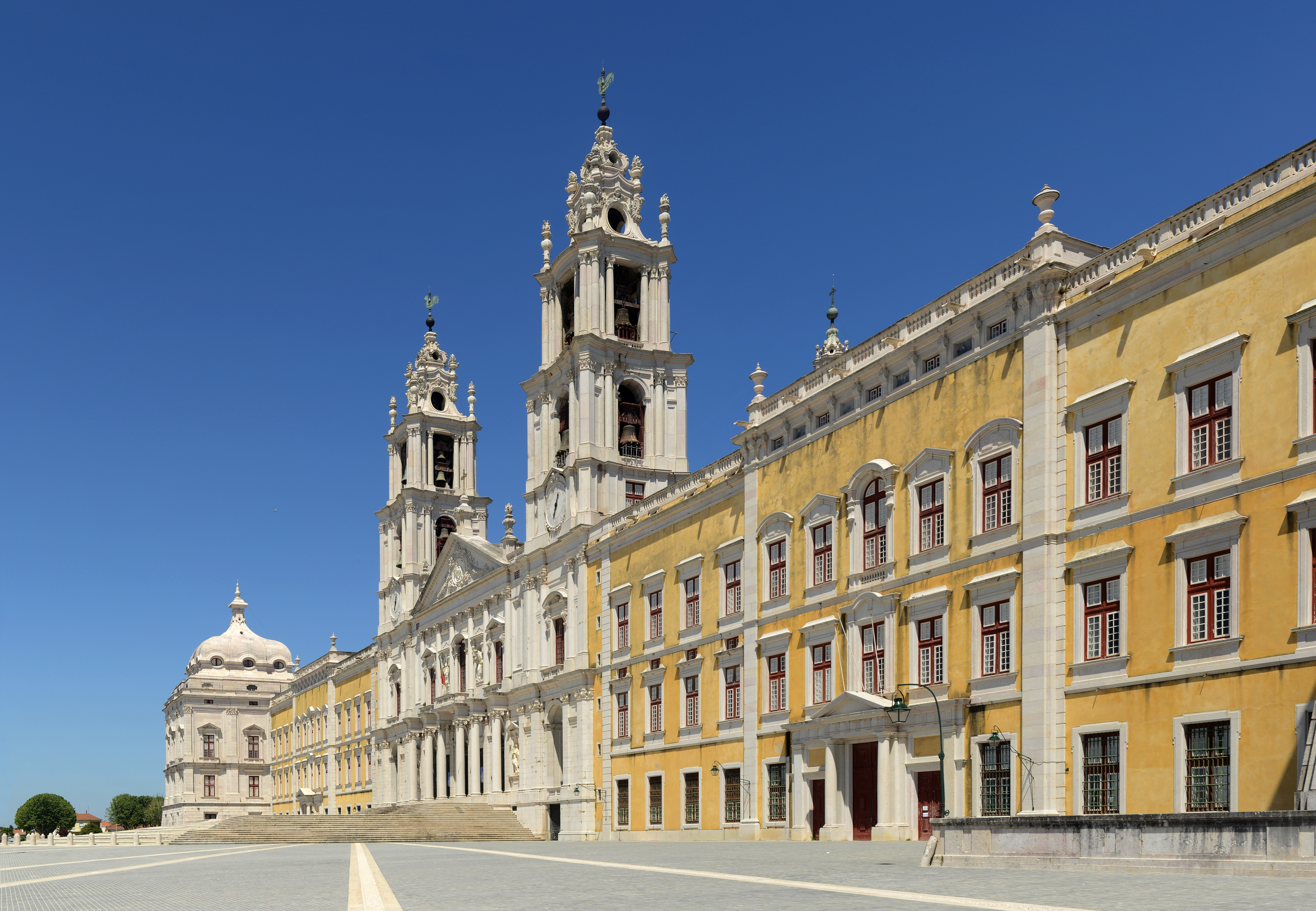

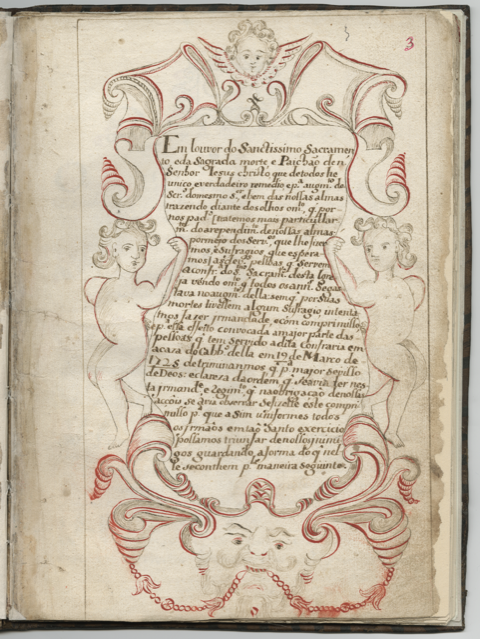
Top: The Royal Building of Mafra Bottom: The original Statutes of June 1725

The confraternity was created in the 16th century, at the St. Andrew's Church. The first record of the confraternity appears in a will dated 14 March 1597, and the oldest document of the confraternity is the Statutes agreement of 5 June 1725.

Dom Tomás Xavier de Lima, 13th Viscount of Vila Nova de Cerveira and 1st Marquis of Ponte de Lima, Secretary of State of the Kingdom of Portugal from 1 April 1786 to 15 December 1788, was a member of the confraternity. Another member was the Capitão-Mor (High-Captain) of Mafra, José Máximo de Carvalho, mentioned by William Beckford in his diary.

In 1835, after the extinction of religious orders in Portugal, the confraternity moved to the Basilica of Our Lady and St. Anthony in Mafra, at the invitation of Queen Maria II of Portugal.

In 1866 the Civil Government bequeathed the assets of the extinct Third Order of St. Francis to this institution, and later also received the assets of the extinct Confraternity of the Lord Jesus of the Stations of Mafra (Portuguese: Irmandade do Senhor Jesus dos Passos de Mafra), while assigning to the confraternity the responsibility of organising all processions according to the local religious calendar.

The confraternity remained under the patronage of the Portuguese monarchy until the proclamation of the Republic in 1910. Manuel II, the last King of Portugal was a lifetime honorary member of the confraternity. In 1953, after the return of the Procession of the Seven Sorrows of Our Lady, the confraternity received the assets of the extinct Confraternity of Our Lady of Sorrows of Mafra (Irmandade de Nossa Senhora das Dores de Mafra, in Portuguese), again with the responsibility of organising this procession annually.

On 10 November 2020, Pope Francis granted a canonical coronation to the image of Our Lady of Solitude guarded by the confraternity. This announcement was made public on 13 December 2020 with the Mafra carillons playing the Inno e Marcia Pontificale. The statue was crowned on 17 September 2023 with a crown personally blessed by Pope Francis, simultaneously with the Fourth Pan-European Forum of Brotherhoods and Confraternities.

== Traditional Lent season processions in Mafra ==
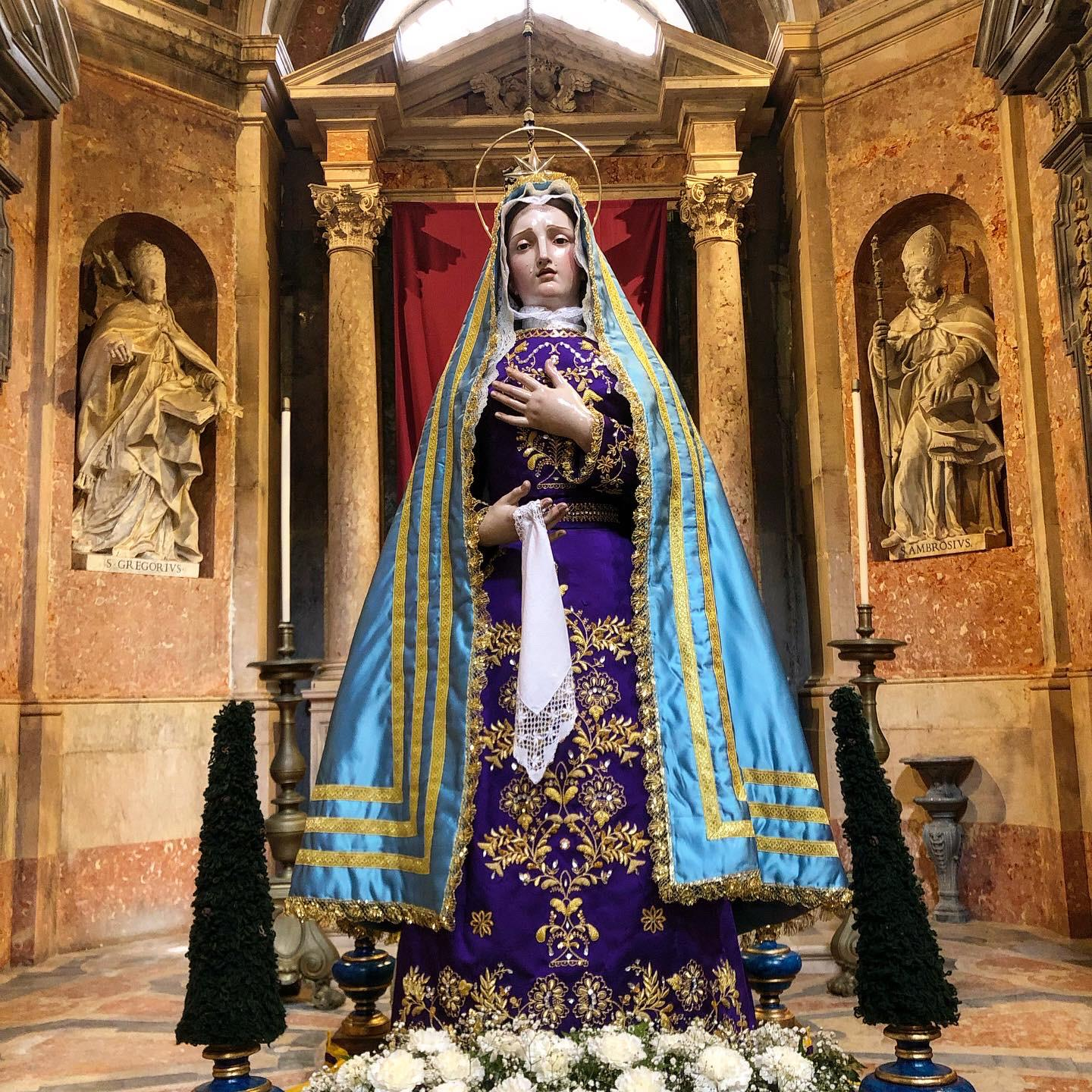
Our Lady of Solitude, Mafra

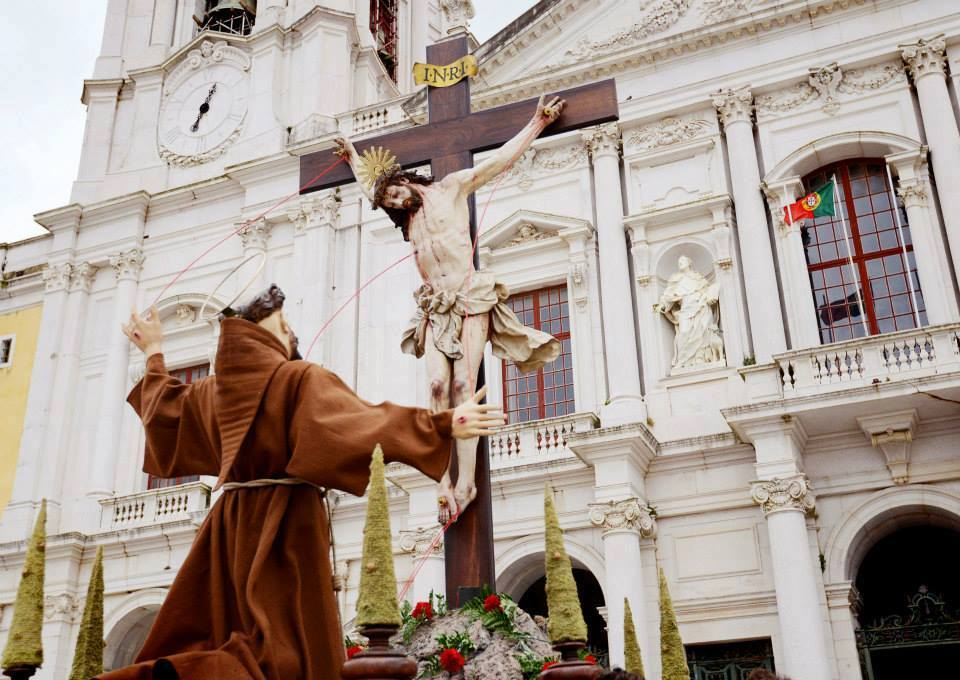
Stigmatisation of St. Francis in Mount La Verna

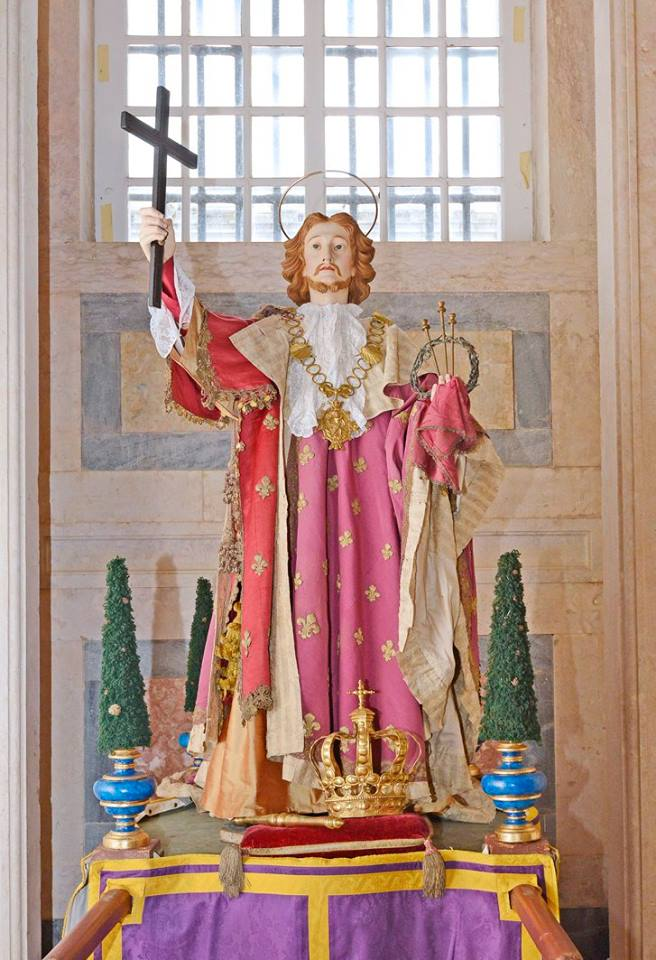
St. Louis (Louis IX of France), by Manuel Dias

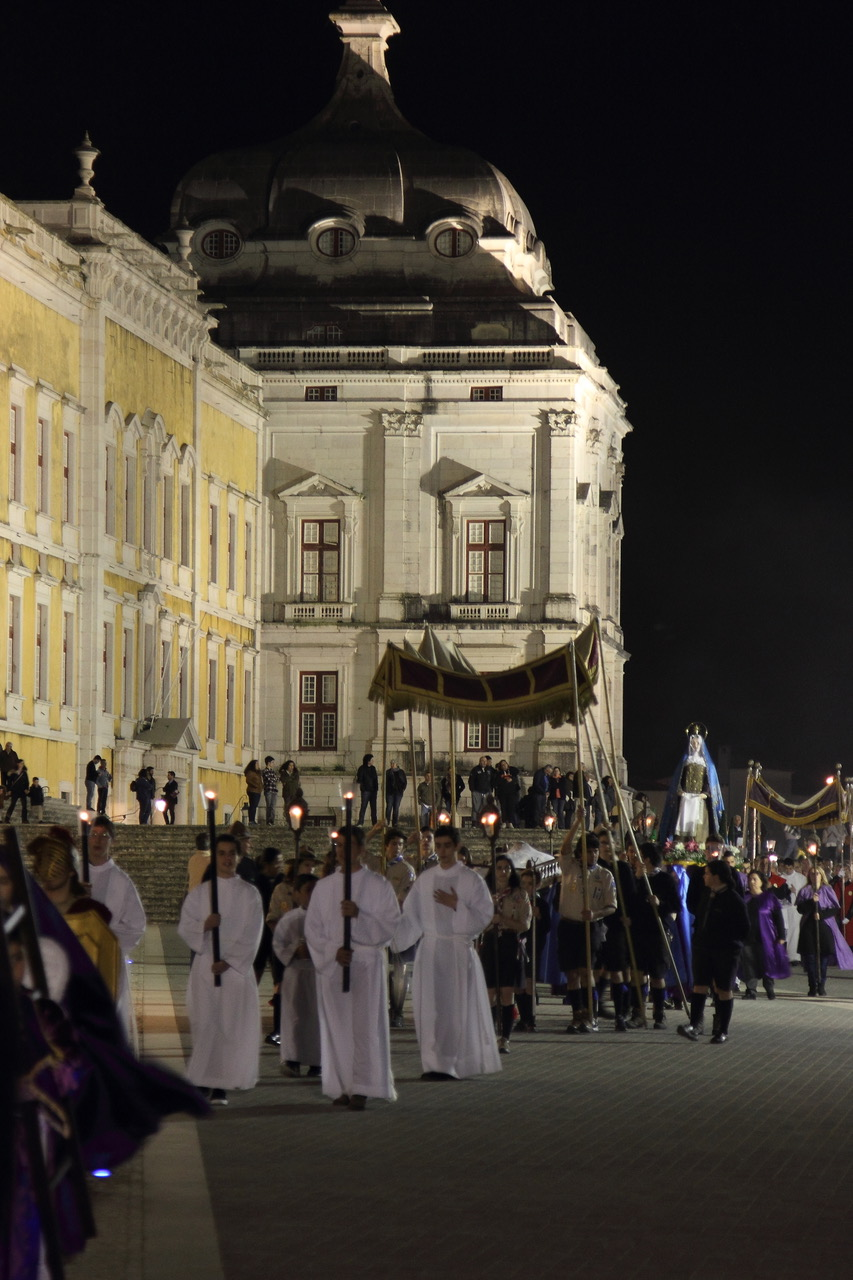
Procession of the Burial of the Lord in Mafra

The processions of Lent in Mafra started in the 18th century. Thanks to conservation and restoration efforts, these ceremonies maintain the grand Baroque flair.

These processions were officially declared by the Municipality as Intangible Cultural Heritage of Municipal Interest.

=== Procession of the Passion of the Lord (Via Crucis) ===
This is one of the oldest expressions of piety in Mafra, and originated from the old collegiate church of St. Andrew's in the 17th century.

It takes place on the second Sunday of Lent, which is also known as the Procession of Encounter, and is composed of two processions that join at a determined moment of the route.

The Procession of the Passion of the Lord exits from the basilica of the Royal Building of Mafra and of Our Lady which exits from Campo Santo Chapel, also located in the Royal Building of Mafra.

=== Procession of Penance of the Third Order of Saint Francis ===
The first procession occurred on 27 March 1740, as a religious festivity directly related to the work of the Third Order of Saint Francis of Mafra patron, King John V.

This procession occurs on the fourth Sunday of Lent. Its processional protocol has remained unchanged since inception by Brother Matias da Conceição, Librarian of the Convent of Mafra. It is therefore a unique cultural manifestation of the solemn and elaborate Baroque period.

The images of the 10 religious litters, alluding to the history of the Franciscans, were created by sculptor Manuel Dias. Most of these pieces still have the original vestments acquired by João Pedro Ludovice, son of Johann Friedrich Ludwig, the architect in charge of the Royal Building of Mafra.

The crucifix used in the litter of the stigmatisation of St. Francis in Mount La Verna is attributed to Anton Maria Maragliano, a genoese sculptor of the Baroque period. Was offered to the Third Order of Mafra by Domenico Massa, the carpenter tasked with the installation of the carillons in the towers of the Basilica.

=== Procession of the Seven Sorrows of Our Lady ===
The Confraternity of Our Lady of Sorrows, created in 1779, in the old collegiate church of St. Andrew's in Mafra, organized the first procession in 1793.

It takes place on Palm Sunday, the Sunday after the Friday of Sorrows celebrating the Feast of the Seven Sorrows of Our Lady.

The procession is composed of seven religious litters corresponding to the seven sorrows of the Mother of Jesus, and an eighth, with the image of Our Lady of Sorrows.

It comprises more than fifty images attributed to the sculptor Joaquim José de Barros Laborão, one of the last masters from the School of Sculpture of Mafra, according to Armindo Ayres de Carvalho.

This procession is popularly known as "Procession of the Little Donkey" (Portuguese: Procissão da Burrinha), originally depicted in the religious litter of the flight into Egypt, in which the Virgin is depicted as seated on a donkey.

=== Procession of the Burial of the Lord ===
The exact origin of this procession is uncertain. It takes place on the night of Good Friday.

In 1773, the Third Order of St. Francis commissioned a new image of Our Lady of Solitude, this same image still used on the procession.

This solemn procession, represents the death of Our Lord Jesus Christ. The silent funeral procession, is accompanied by Veronica’s and The Three Marys lamentations.

This ancient Catholic tradition, and unique to Mafra, is accompanied by the Centurion, a typical figure in the town's folk art, dressed in original garments dating back to the 18th century.

== Bibliography ==
- Beckford, William. Diário de William Beckford em Portugal e Espanha (in Portuguese). Vol. 3.ª ed. (reimp.). Lisboa: Biblioteca Nacional de Portugal, 2009. ISBN 978-972-565-429-3.
- Carvalho, A. Ayres. Obra Mafrense (in Portuguese). Vol. Mafra: Câmara Municipal de Mafra, 1992. ISBN 972-9181-17-9.
- Galrão, Carlos. A pia baptismal da igreja de Santo André (in Portuguese). Vol. O Concelho de Mafra, n.º 372. Mafra: Tipografia Liberty.
- Mafra Sacra : memória & património, 1717–2017 (in Portuguese). Vol. coord. Tiago Henriques. – 1ª ed. – Sintra : Zéfiro, Mafra : Real e Venerável Irmandade do Santíssimo Sacramento da Paróquia de Santo André de Mafra, 2017. – 461, [3] p. : il., 30 cm. – (Mafra Sacra). ISBN 978-989-677-153-9.
- Pereira, Fernando António Baptista. Do Gótico ao Maneirismo: A Arte na Região de Mafra na Época dos Descobrimentos (in Portuguese). Vol. Mafra: Câmara Municipal de Mafra, 2000.
- Pimentel, António Filipe. Aquitectura e Poder — O Real Edifício de Mafra (in Portuguese). Vol. Lisboa: Livros Horizonte, 2002. ISBN 972-24-1172-1.
- Prado, Frei João de S. José do. Monumento Sacro da Fabrica, E Solemnissima Sagração da Santa Basílica do Real Convento, Que Junto à Villa de Mafra Dedicou a N. Senhora, e Santo António a Magestade Augusta do Maximo Rey D. João V (in Portuguese). Vol. Lisboa: na Officina de Miguel Rodrigues, impressor do Eminent. Senhor Card. Patriarca, 1751.
- Saldanha Lopes, Luiz. A camisa da sagração de Luís XV e a Irmandade do Santíssimo Sacramento de Mafra/La Chemise du Sacre de Louis XV et la Confrérie du Très Saint Sacrement de Mafra (in Portuguese and French). Vol. 1.ª ed. Mafra: Irmandade do Santíssimo Sacramento de Mafra, 2016. ISBN 978-989-20-6280-8.
- Saldanha, Sandra Costa. Um crucifixo de Anton Maria Maragliano em Mafra: oferta do genovês Domenico Massa à Ordem Terceira da Penitência (in Portuguese). Vol. Invenire: Revista de Bens Culturais da Igreja, n.º 7, 2013.
- Vale, Teresa Leonor M. Os Garvo – Uma família de artistas italianos em Lisboa e o seu papel no contexto da arte portuguesa de seiscentos e setecentos (in Portuguese). Vol. In Le nove son tanto e tante buone, che dir non-se ne pò Lisboa dos Italianos: História e Arte (sécs. XIV-XVIII), Nunziatella Alessandrini et al. (eds., ). Lisboa: Cátedra de Estudos Sefarditas "Alberto Benveniste", 2013. ISBN 978-989-96236-3-7.
- Ventura, Margarida Garcez. A Colegiada de Santo André de Mafra (Séculos XV-XVIII) (in Portuguese). Vol. Mafra: Câmara Municipal de Mafra, 2002. ISBN 972-8204-30-2.
