= Convent of Victory (Madrid) =

Foundation of the Order of the Minims

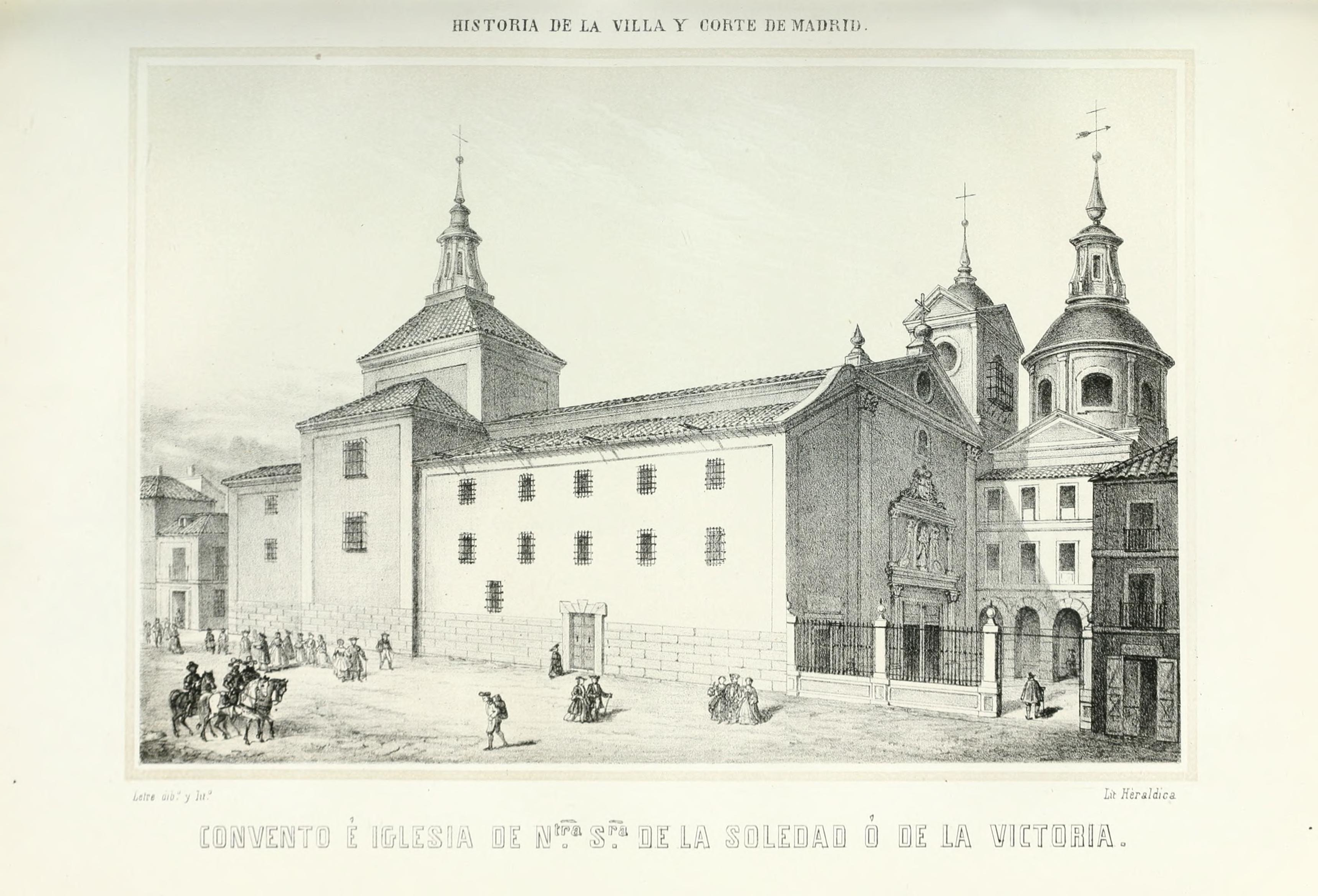

The Convent of Our Lady of Victory (known simply as the Convent of Victory and Minims of Victory), located in the Puerta del Sol in Madrid, was a foundation of the Order of the Minims, in the vicinity of Carrera de San Jerónimo. It had a neoclassical church with a chapel dedicated to Our Lady of Solitude (her image, sculpted by Gaspar Becerra, became very popular and was taken out in the Good Friday procession), and apparently during the reigns of Philip III and Philip IV its Mass of the Victory became famous.

== History ==
Its foundation stems from the military feat of the Catholic Monarchs when they laid siege to the city of Málaga in 1487 and Saint Francis of Paola prophesied the victory of the Christian army. In gratitude, the Monarchs endorsed the founding of the first Spanish convent of the Order of Minims in Málaga in 1493, and later, in 1561, the one in Madrid, thanks to Friar Juan de Vitoria, Provincial of Castile of the Order of Saint Francis of Paola. The convent celebrated its first mass on August 7 of that year, attended by the Prince of Asturias, Infante Don Carlos. The construction of the convent was supported by Isabel de Valois. The convent suffered severe damage during the Peninsular War, but was later restored. Like the neighboring convent of San Felipe el Real, it existed until the Mendizábal confiscation of property in 1836, which decreed its final demolition. The clearing of the immense site it occupied allowed for the widening of San Jerónimo Street and the opening of Espoz y Mina Street and the surrounding streets and alleys.

This convent was located in the area between Puerta del Sol itself (on the corner) and the current streets of La Victoria, La Cruz, Cádiz, and Carretas. This church had its door on the current Espoz y Mina street (which did not exist at that time) and was famous among ladies and gentlemen for celebrating a "light mass" (of short duration). The church appears frequently in the literature of the 16th century and later, in works by Tirso de Molina (La celosa de sí misma, 1620), Vélez de Guevara (El Diablo Cojuelo, Moreto (El Caballero, 1652) or Antonio Solís (La gitanilla de Madrid, 1656).
