= Soledad Florendo =

Filipino physician

Soledad Arcega Florendo
- Born: 17 October 1903
- Education: National Jewish Hospital (M.A.)
- Spouse: Gerardo Florendo
- Scientific career
- Fields: Medicine
- Workplaces: Philippine Department of Health; Quezon Institute

Soledad Florendo (born 16 July 1903) was a Filipino physician who spent most of her career fighting tuberculosis.

== Biography ==
Soledad Arcega Florendo was born on 17 October 1903. Inspired by her cousin, Dr. Olivia Salamanca, one of the first female doctors in the Philippines, she decided upon a medical career. Where she attended medical school is unknown, but she did her residency at National Jewish Hospital in Denver, Colorado, which specialized in respiratory diseases like tuberculosis. While in Denver, Florendo earned an M.A. in hospital administration. Upon her return to the Philippines, she worked for the Philippine Tuberculosis Society in various hospitals and sanatoriums. Florendo later was a training officer for the Philippine Department of Health and was then superintendent of the Quezon Institute. She was lecturer in hospital administration in the Institute of Hygenie and Public Health before she became chair of the Department of Social Work at Philippine State University in 1965. Florendo was a member of the United Nations Mission for the Evaluation of Family Planning in India. She "received an award from the Manila Medical Society for her contribution to medical social service in expanding education and home visitation aid to tubercular patients." Nothing further is known about her life.
