= Igreja de Santo André (Vila Boa de Quires) =

Church in Porto District, Portugal

Coordinates: 41.2081317°N 8.203282°W

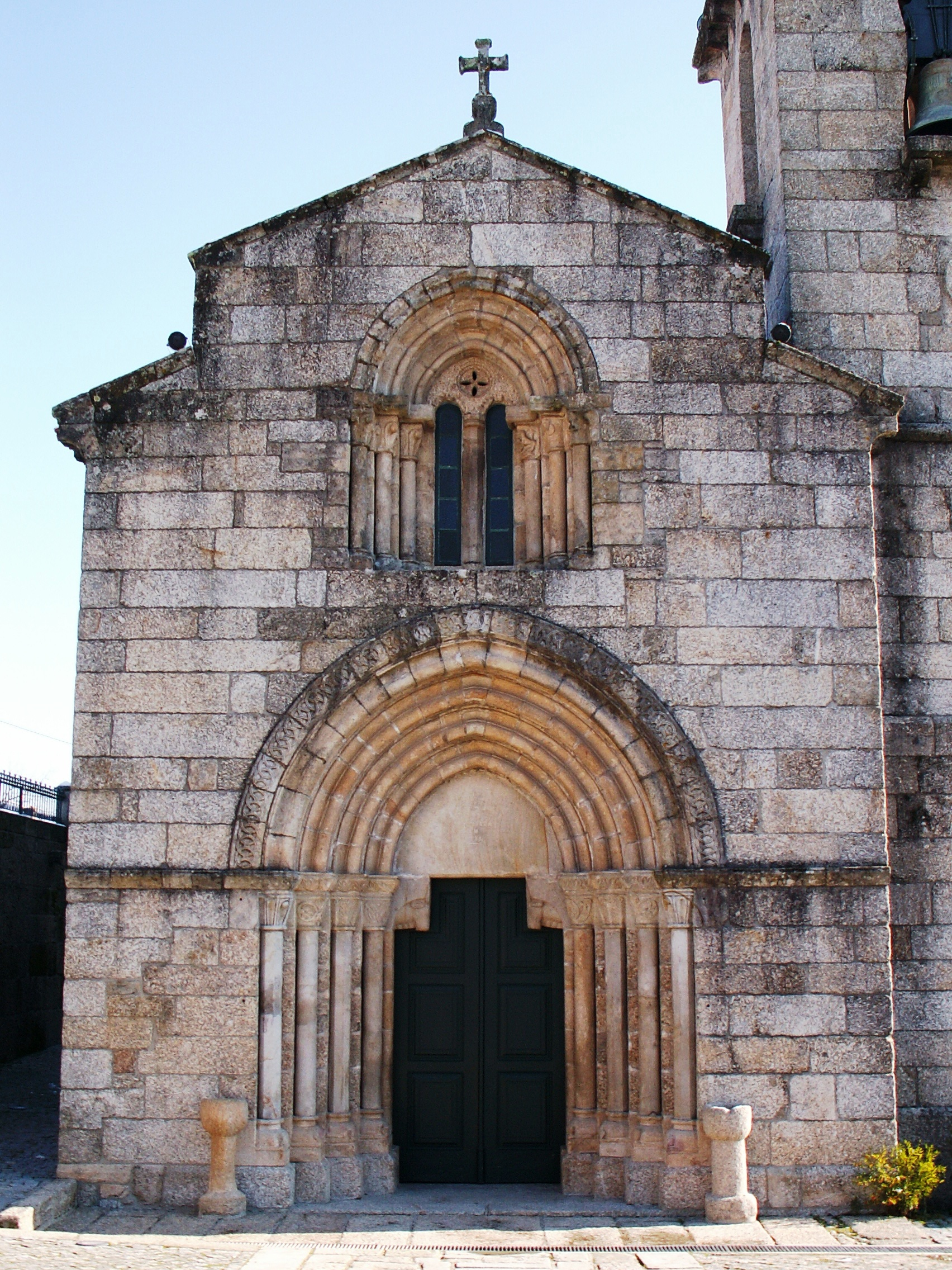

Igreja de Santo André is a church in Portugal. It is classified as a National Monument.
