= Marisol =

Marisol is a Spanish name. It is a shortened form of María de la Soledad (literally "Mary of the solitude"), a title given to the Virgin Mary, corresponding to English "Our Lady of Solitude".

Coincidentally, Marisol sounds like "mar y sol", Spanish for "sea and sun". The name might be reinterpreted as such or sunny sea.

Marisol may refer to:

== People ==
- Marisol (actress) (born Josefa Flores Gonzalez, born 1948), Spanish singer and actress
- Marisol Argueta de Barillas (born 1968), Salvadoran politician
- Marisol Ayuso (born 1943), Spanish actress
- Marisol Deluna (born 1967), American fashion designer
- Marisol Escobar (1930-2016), French and Venezuelan sculptor known mononymically as Marisol
- Marisol Espinoza (born 1967), Peruvian politician
- Marisol González (born 1983), Mexican beauty queen
- Marisol Malaret (1949–2023), Puerto Rican beauty queen
- Marisol Maldonado, American model
- Marisol Nichols (born 1973), American actress
- Marisol Touraine (born 1959), French politician
- Marisol Valles García (born 1989), Mexican police chief

== Characters ==
- Marisol Chavez in Oculus (film)
- Marisol Coxi, from Monster High
- Marisol Delko Caine in CSI: Miami
- Marisol Durán in The Cheetah Girls 2
- Marisol "Flaca" Gonzales in Orange Is the New Black
- Marisol Guzman, in Hard Love
- Marisol Lewis in Degrassi
- Marisol, recurring character in The Boss Baby: Back in Business
- Marisol Luna, character from the American Girl series of dolls and books
- Marisol Suarez in Devious Maids
- Marisol in Devour
- Marisol in Fistful of Dollars
- Marisol in George Lopez (TV series)
- Marisol in Third and Indiana
- Marisol Fuentes in Mr. Iglesias
- Marisol de la Gorgonzola, character created by Brandon Rogers
- Marisol Vera, character in Charmed
- Marisol Sanchez, character in Vida (TV series)
- Marisol Rios De La Luz, the alter ego of La Borinqueña, a superhero protecting Puerto Rico.

== Entertainment ==
- Marisol (Mexican TV series), a 1996 Mexican telenovela
  - Marisol (Brazilian TV series), a 2002 Brazilian telenovela, remake of Mexican telenovela
- Marisol (play), a 1993 play by José Rivera
- "Marisol", by Lotus, Feather on Wood (2009)
- "Marisol", a track from Emily Osment's debut studio album, Fight or Flight
