= Our Lady of Solitude =

Title of Virgin Mary

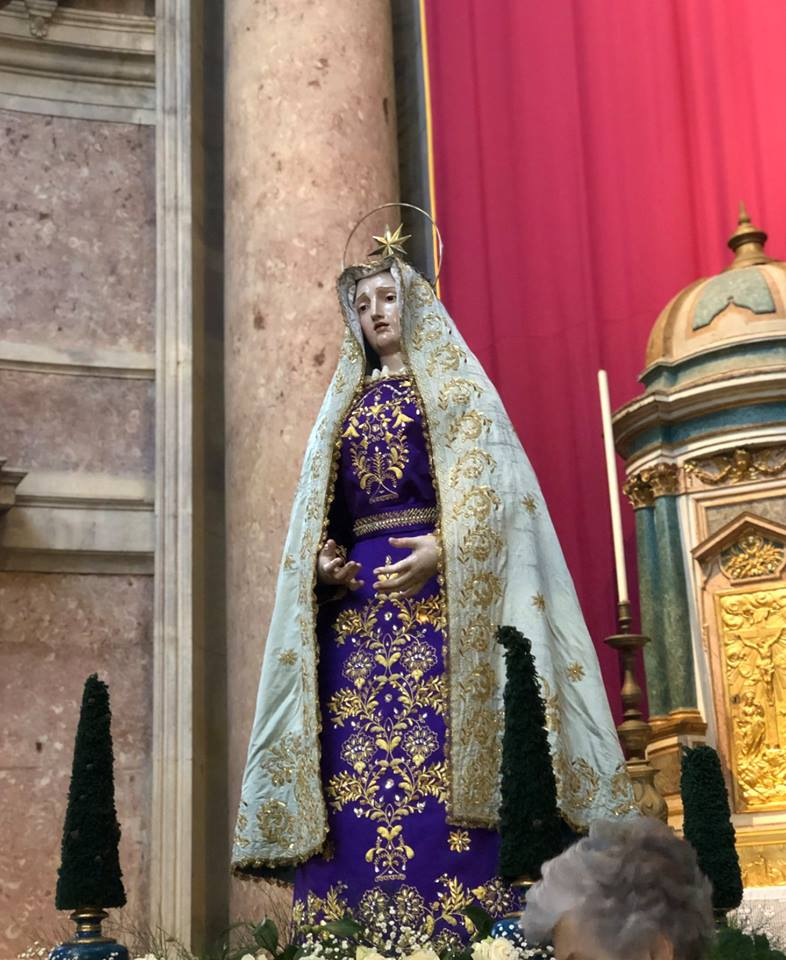
- Our Lady of Solitude of the Basilica of Mafra, Portugal.
- Venerated in: Roman Catholic Church

Our Lady of Solitude (Spanish: María de la Soledad; Portuguese: Nossa Senhora da Soledade) is a title of Mary, mother of Jesus and a special form of Marian devotion practised in Spanish and Portuguese speaking countries to commemorate the solitude of Mary on Holy Saturday. Variant names include Nuestra Señora de la Soledad, Maria Santisima, Nuestra Señora Dolorosisima de la Soledad, and Virgen de la Soledad.

== History ==
The title originates with Queen Juana lamenting the early death of her husband Philip I of Castile in 1506.

== Feast ==
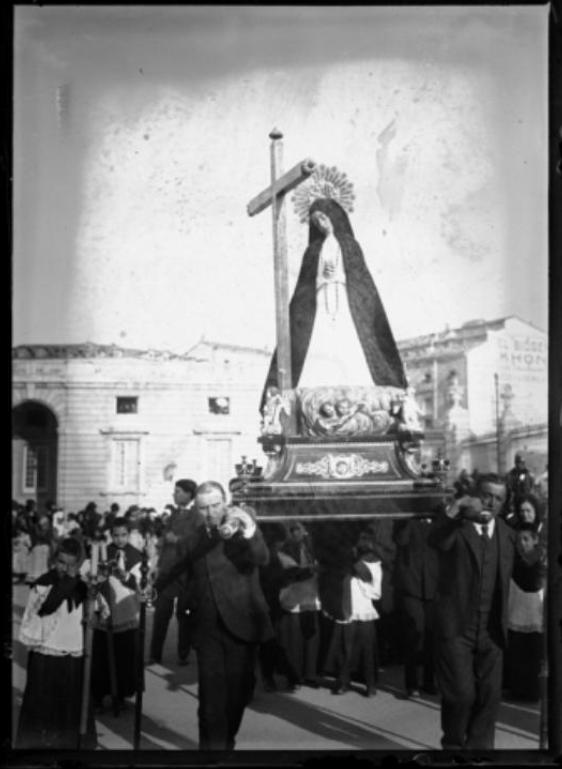
Our Lady of Solitude in the Procesión del Silencio in Madrid 1915.

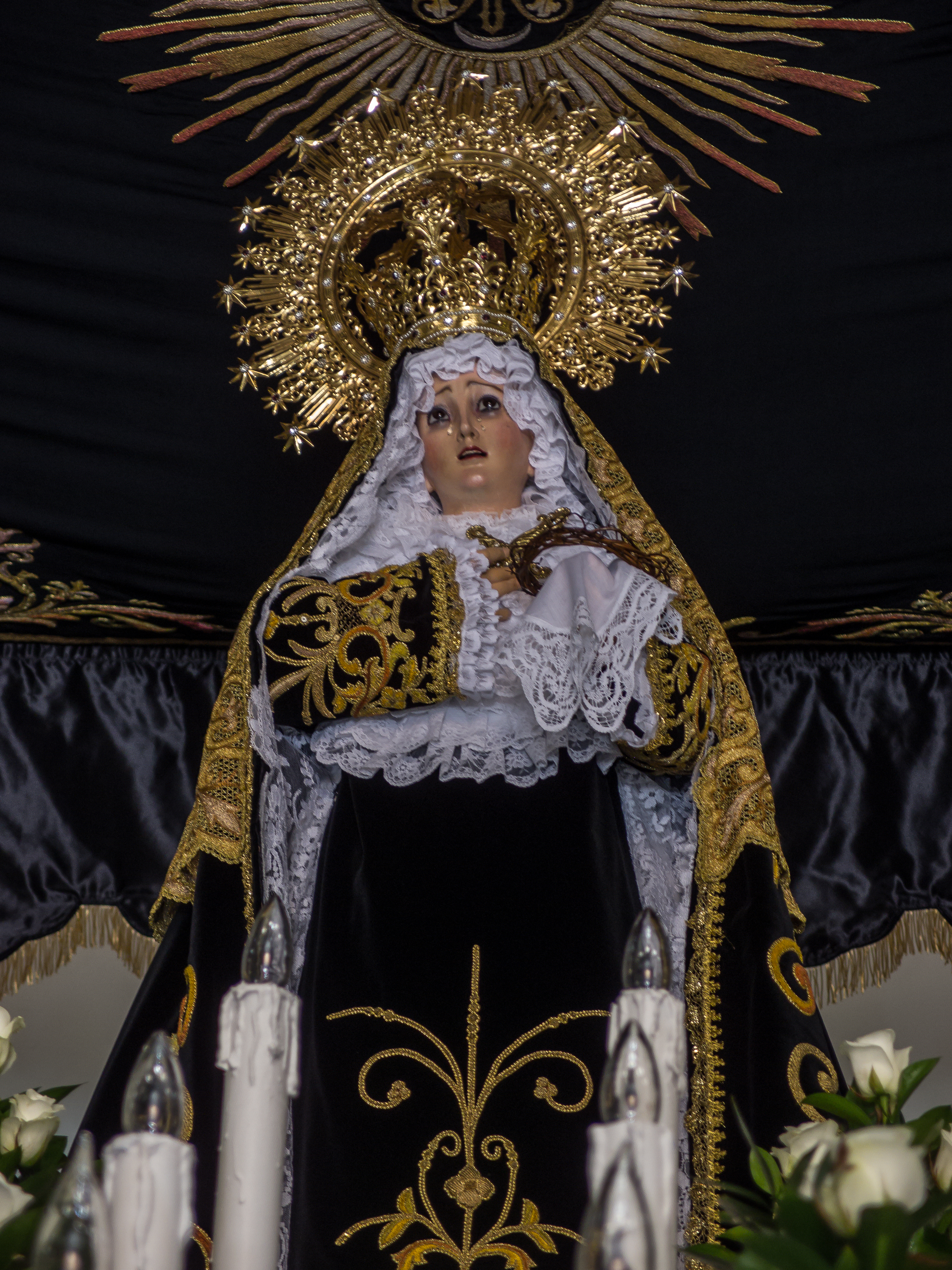
Our Lady of Solitude in Teruel, Spain

"This devotion was instituted to compassionate Our Lady for her solitude on Holy Saturday and is akin to the devotion practiced among the Servites on Good Friday called the Desolata."

María de la Soledad's feast day is celebrated on December 18 in Spanish-speaking countries, on Holy Saturday in English-speaking, and on Good Friday in Portuguese-speaking countries. In Oaxaca, Mexico devotions are held on the Sunday before Christmas.

== In the convent of Our Lady of Victory ==
Isabel de Valois, wife of Felipe II, had in a private oratory a painting representing the Virgin of the Solitude that she had brought with her from France. The image of the picture aroused great devotion in friars of the Order of the Minims of San Francisco de Paula, who had settled in Madrid following in the footsteps of the monarch. The friars asked permission of the queen to have a copy of the image for the chapel of their convent of Our Lady of Victory in Madrid. The image of Our Lady of Solitude was carved by the sculptor Gaspar Becerra.

From the beginning, the image was intended to be "vestidera", with only the head and hands carved and the rest a wooden frame covered with clothes. It seems that on the initiative of the Countess of Ureña, Doña María de la Cueva y Toledo, the queen's main waitress, she wore her own outfit of a noble widow of the time; this characteristic attire added to other peculiarities – such as wearing a diadem in place of crown, and the symbols of the Passion – constituted a true revolution in the typology of Marian images.

In 1565, finally, after more than a year of work, the statue of Our Lady of Solitude was presented to the convent of Our Lady of Victory.

== Patroness ==
María de la Soledad is the patroness of Badajoz and Parla, Spain; Porto Covo, Portugal;Acapulco, Mexico; and Cavite Province (Nuestra Señora de la Soledad de Porta Vaga) and San Isidro, Nueva Ecija, the Philippines.

The Mission Nuestra Señora de la Soledad in Soledad, California, is dedicated to Our Lady of Solitude.

== Pontifical approbations ==
- Pope Pius X granted a Canonical coronation towards a Nuestra Señora de la Soledad image of Oaxaca on 18 January 1904.
- Pope Pius XI granted a Canonical coronation towards an Our Lady of Solitude image of Irapuato on 30 April 1922.
- Pope Pius XII granted a Canonical coronation towards a Nuestra Señora de la Soledad de Parral image of Parral, Chihuahua, on 22 October 1943.
- Pope John XXIII granted a Canonical coronation towards a Nuestra Señora de la Soledad de la Portería image of Las Palmas on 19 March 1964.
- Pope Paul VI granted a Canonical coronation towards a Nuestra Señora de la Soledad de Acapulco image of Acapulco on 8 December 1965.
- Pope John Paul II granted a Canonical coronation towards a María Santísima de la Soledad image of Priego de Córdoba on 26 June 1994.
- Pope Francis granted a Canonical coronation towards a Nuestra Señora de la Soledad de Porta Vaga image of Cavite on 18 November 2018.
- Pope Francis granted a Canonical coronation towards a Nuestra Señora de la Soledad image of Ciempozuelos on 4 May 2019.
- Pope Francis granted a Canonical coronation towards a Our Lady of Solitude of Mafra image of Mafra on 10 November 2020.

== Name ==
The given name María de la Soledad, often shortened to Marisol or Soledad, is used in Spanish-speaking countries.

The devotional affix "de Soledade" is used in Lusophone countries.

== See also ==
- Our Lady of Sorrows
- Soledad (disambiguation) mentions many people, places, and institutions named for María de la Soledad
