= Palace of São João Novo =

- Palácio de São João Novo
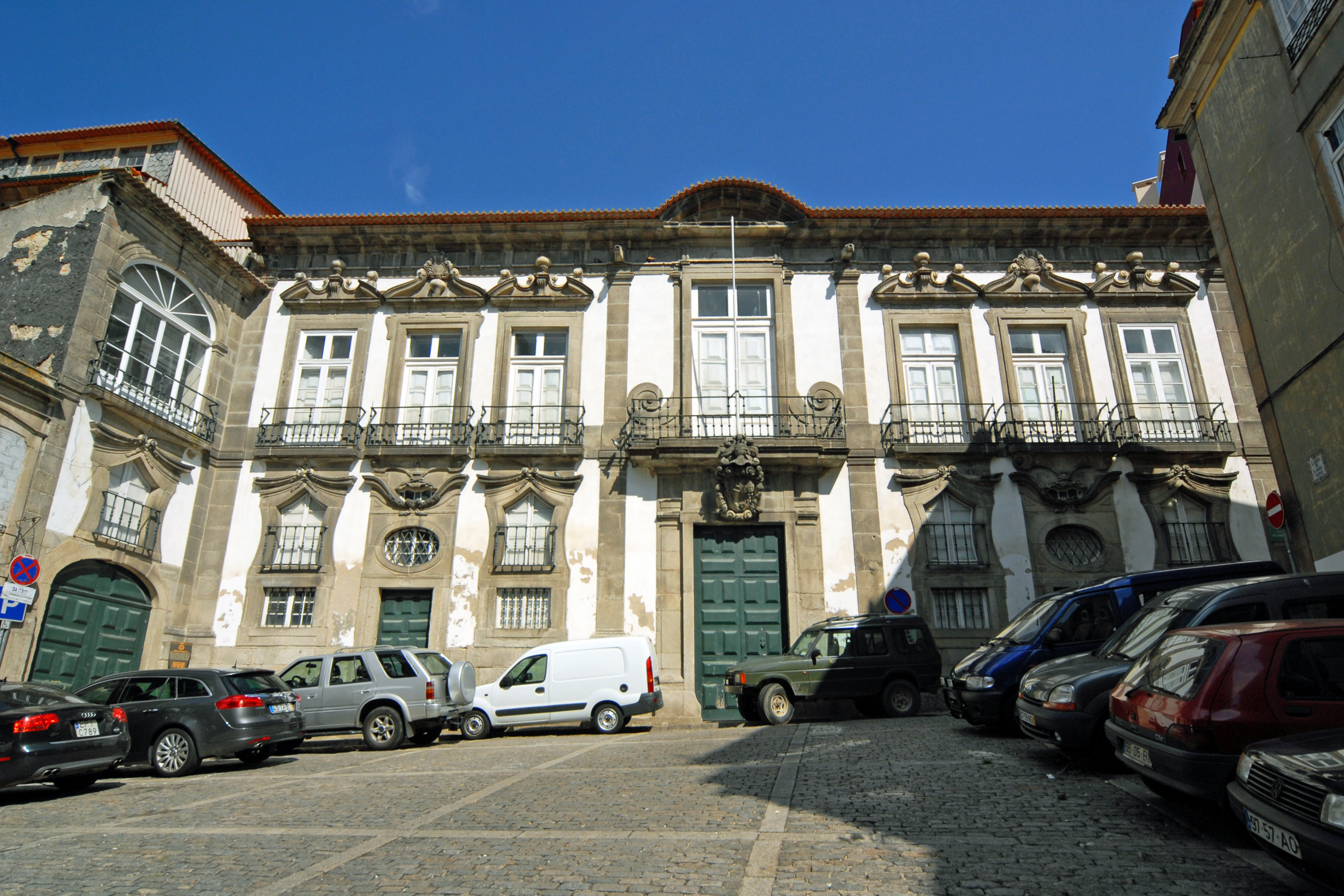
- An oblique view of the principal facade of the Palace
- Interactive map of the Palace of São João Novo area

General information
- Type: Palace
- Architectural style: Baroque
- Location: Cedofeita, Santo Ildefonso, Sé, Miragaia, São Nicolau e Vitória, Portugal
- Coordinates: 41°8′33″N 8°37′4″W
- Opened: 1747
- Owner: Portuguese Republic

Technical details
- Material: Granite

Design and construction
- Architect: Nicolau Nasoni

The Palace of São João Novo (Portuguese: Palácio de São João Novo) is a palace/residence in the civil parish of Cedofeita, Santo Ildefonso, Sé, Miragaia, São Nicolau e Vitória, in the municipality of Porto, in the Portuguese district of the same name.

== History ==
The palace was constructed in 1727 by Pedro Costa Lima.

In the 19th century, the palace was expanded, towards the west.

On 15 December 1945, the museum was inaugurated to house regional artefacts and to re-create and display traditional environments, through the initiaties of ethnographer Dr. Pedro Vitorino.

In 1984, a fire destroyed the area occupied by the museum directorate offices.

On 9 August 1991, the museum was placed under the supervision of the Instituto Português de Museus (Portuguese Institute for Museum), by decree 278/91 (Diário da República, Série-1A), but the Museum of Ethnology was closed to the public in 1992.

The building was owned by the descendants of Álvaro Leite Pereira de Melo Ferreira da Silva Pinto in 1994.

The property was transferred into the authority of the Instituto dos Museus e Conservação, I.P. by decree 97/2007 on 29 March 2007.

== Architecture ==
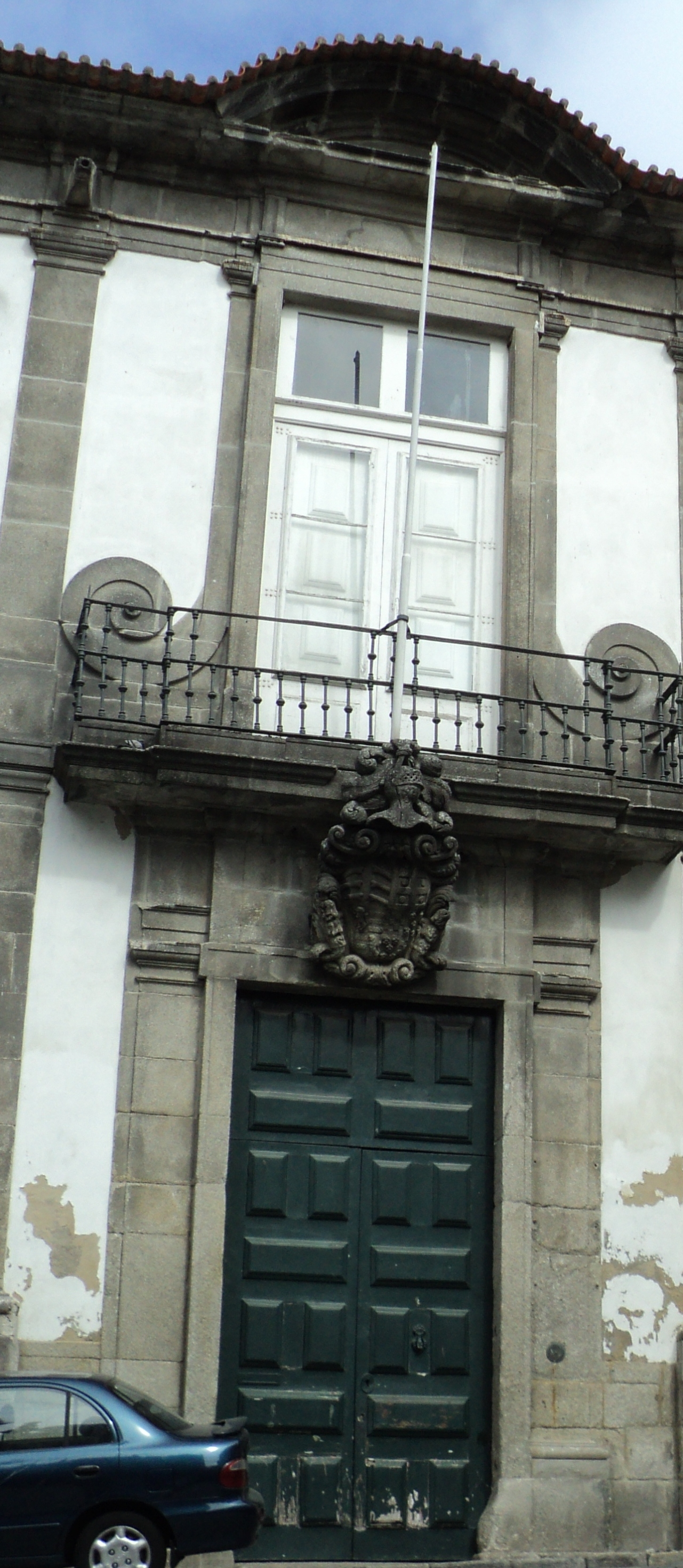
The central register of the palace with principal door

The building is flanked by other buildings within the historic centre of Porto. With an ample public space to the north, it is situated on a slight slope, occupied by a few terraces linked by staircases and pedestrian walkways in granite. The western wing is delimited by a portion of the old city walls. Its principal facade is oriented toward the Largo de São João Novo in the northwest.

The three-storey, L-shaped building with its largest facade oriented to the south, and a small wing, towards the west, covered in tiled roof. The southern facade is symmetric and broken on the ground floor by seven sections, aligned on the first and second floors. On the top floor, are seven windows, of which six are surmounted by broken frontispieces, while the central is much higher and flanked by curvilinear scribes. The ground floor has three doors, with the central doorway surmounted by a granite coat-of-arms. The narrow facade of the smaller corp, is oriented to the square, with the top and ground floors, towards the principal facade.

=== Interior ===
The principal corp is dominated by a central staircase, that occupies (along with the main hall) the entirety of the palace, with two parallel flights that connect the ground floor to the second floor, as well as a unique flight to the third floor. At each floor, the staircase provides a link to the main dependencies on their respective floors, including three great halls.
