= Mafra carillons =

World's largest carillon ensemble, Portugal

Carillon Towers, main façade

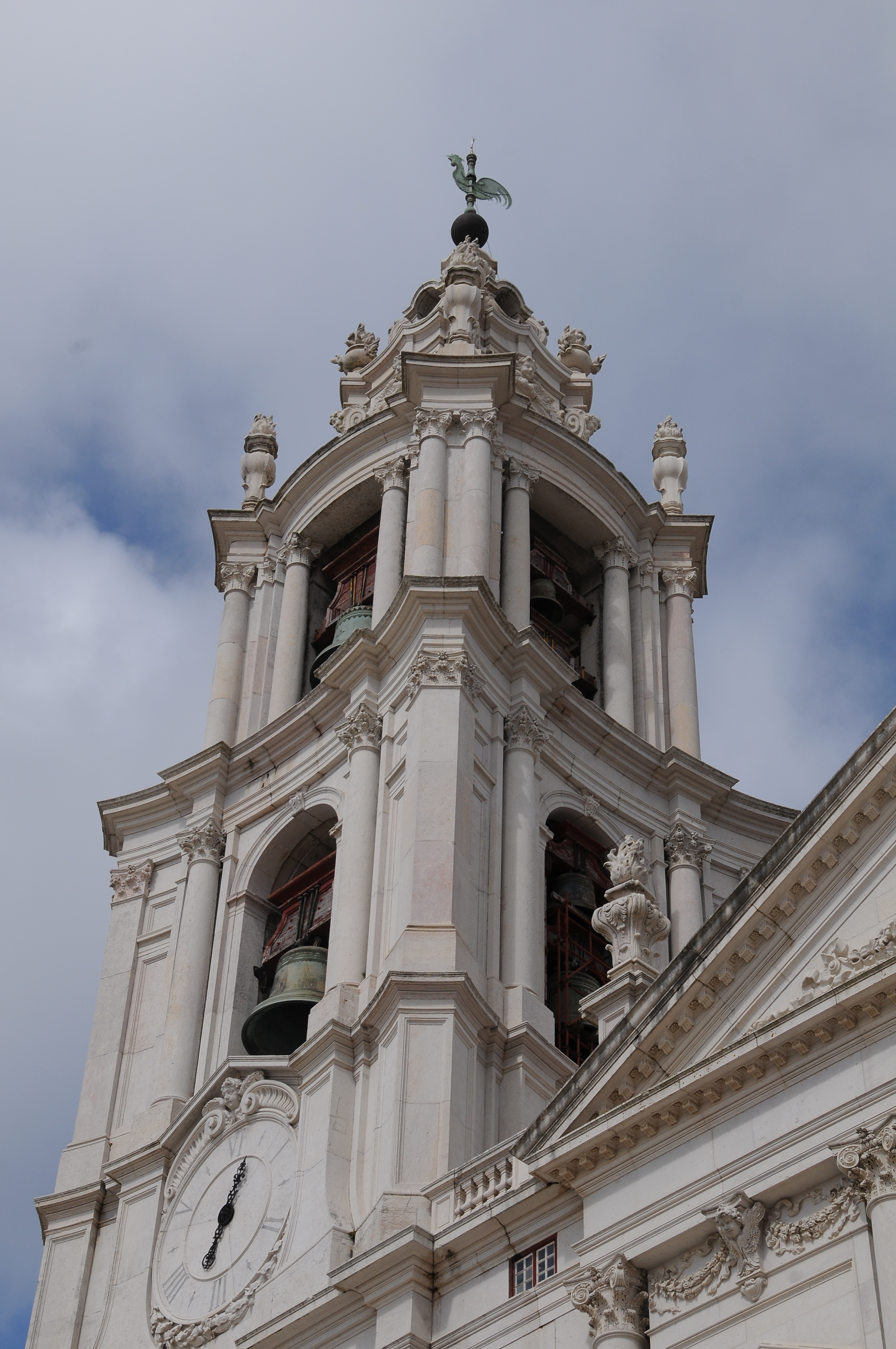
The Levache carillon

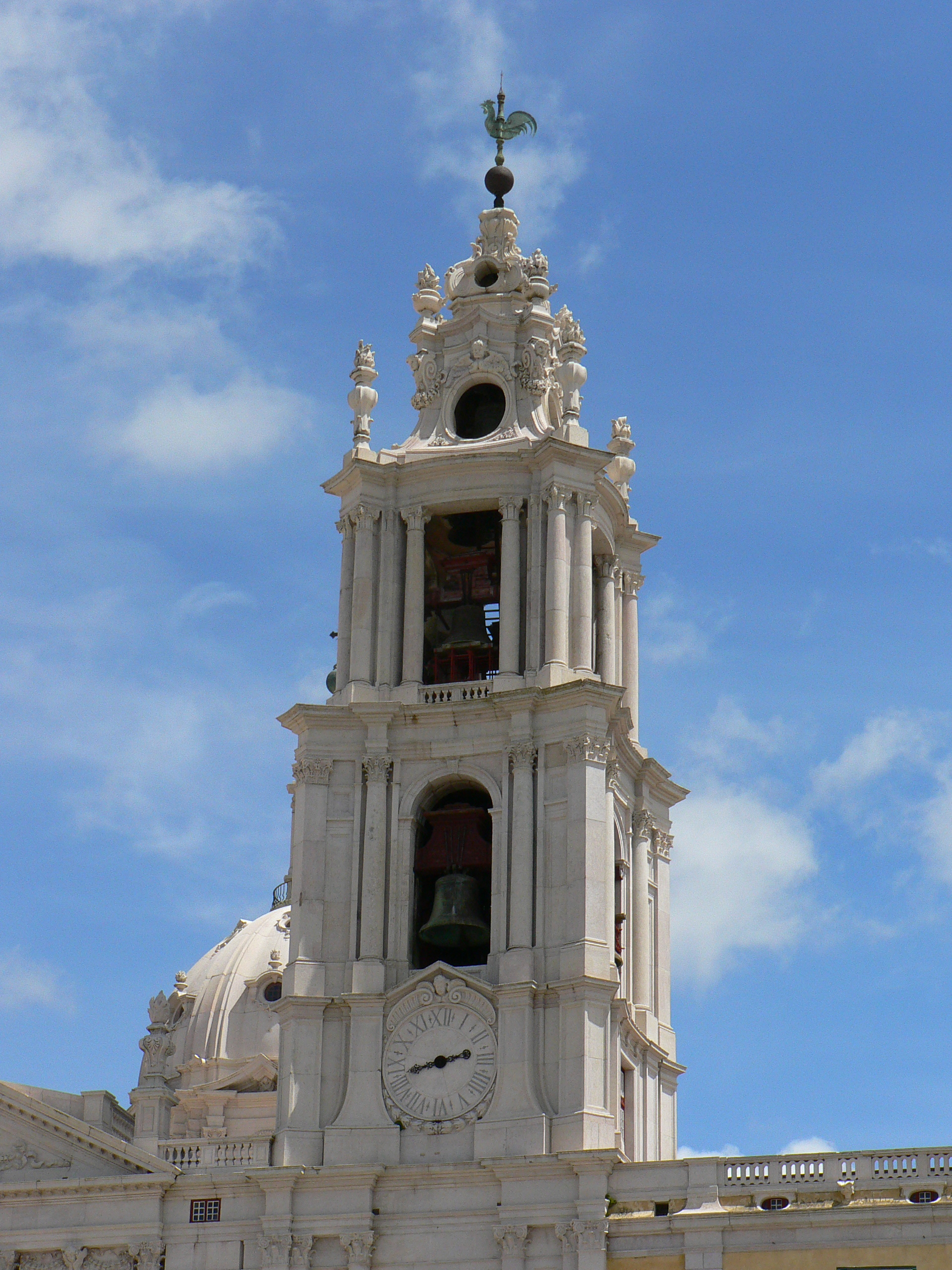
The Witlockx carillon

The Mafra carillons constitute the largest carillon ensemble in the world.

Spanning two 50-metre-high (160 ft) towers in the Palace of Mafra, it features 120 bells, divided into carillon (45 bells in north tower, 53 in the south tower), liturgical and clock bells.

Along with the entire Mafra Royal Building (Portuguese: Edifício Real de Mafra), the carillons were inscribed on UNESCO’s World Heritage List in 2019.

== Description ==
Both carillons are simultaneously composed of two systems:

- A mechanical system, which functions as a Barbieri organ, with two colossal bronze cylinders, where the pegging of musical notes is located. When driven by the clock mechanism, the movement of the cylinders causes pins to strike metal keys or parrots, moving the bell hammers according to a melody programme.
- The mechanical carillon in turn plays every noon, every half and right hour, from sunrise to sunset- a system manually operated by a carillonneur tapping the keyboard with the hands and feet, triggers the bell chimes.

Legend has it that King John V of Portugal had two, not just one carillon ordered, because he simply could afford such lavish commissions. The tower carillons were made by Flemish bell-makers, Nicholas II Levache in Liège and Willem Witlockx foundries in Antwerp.

Each of the bell towers comprising fifty-eight bells, belonging to every forty-nine chimes. The first bells, each weigh 625 ‘arrobas’ [1 arroba = 14,688 kg] or over 9,180 kg. Those of second magnitude, each weigh 291 ’arrobas’ i.e. 4,270 kg each; those of third 231 ’arrobas’ corresponding to 3,392 kg each, those of fourth 99 ’arrobas’ i.e. 1,454 kg each. The magnitude thus decreasing to 1 bell at the smallest, weighing about 15 kg each. Finally the chime wheels and mills weigh 1,420 ‘quintals’ [1 quintal = 58,752 kg] or 83,427.84 kg.

The carillons underwent extensive works between 2015 and 2019, to restore and preserve their optimal performance and splendour.

== The National Palace of Mafra ==
Located 40 km northwest of Lisbon, The Mafra Royal Building and adjacent property, was conceived by King John V (D. João V) in 1711 as a tangible representation of his idea of monarchy and State. This imposing quadrangular building houses the king and queen's palaces, a royal chapel shaped like a Roman baroque basilica, a Franciscan monastery and an impressive library containing 36,000 volumes. The complex is completed by the Cerco garden, with its geometric layout and the royal hunting park and grounds (Portuguese: Tapada de Mafra).

The Royal Monastic Library of the National Palace of Mafra is one of the most important European libraries, with a valuable collection of 18th-century illustrations. It also holds rare works such as the collection of incunabula (works printed before 1501), the famous “Nuremberg Chronicle” (1493), notable Bibles, the French Encyclopédie (edited by Diderot and d'Alembert), illuminated books of hours of the 15th century and an important nucleus of musical scores by Portuguese and foreign composers, especially written for the six historical organs of the Basilica.

This complex is one of the major architectural projects undertaken by King João V, reflecting the wealth and reach of the Portuguese Empire during that period. It is recognized as a prominent example of Baroque architecture in Europe.

== Present usage ==
Currently, the carillons are played in concerts organized by the Palace of Mafra and the Municipality of Mafra. They are also played in the religious ceremonies, namely the processions of the season of Lent in Mafra.
