= Basilica organs of the Palace of Mafra =

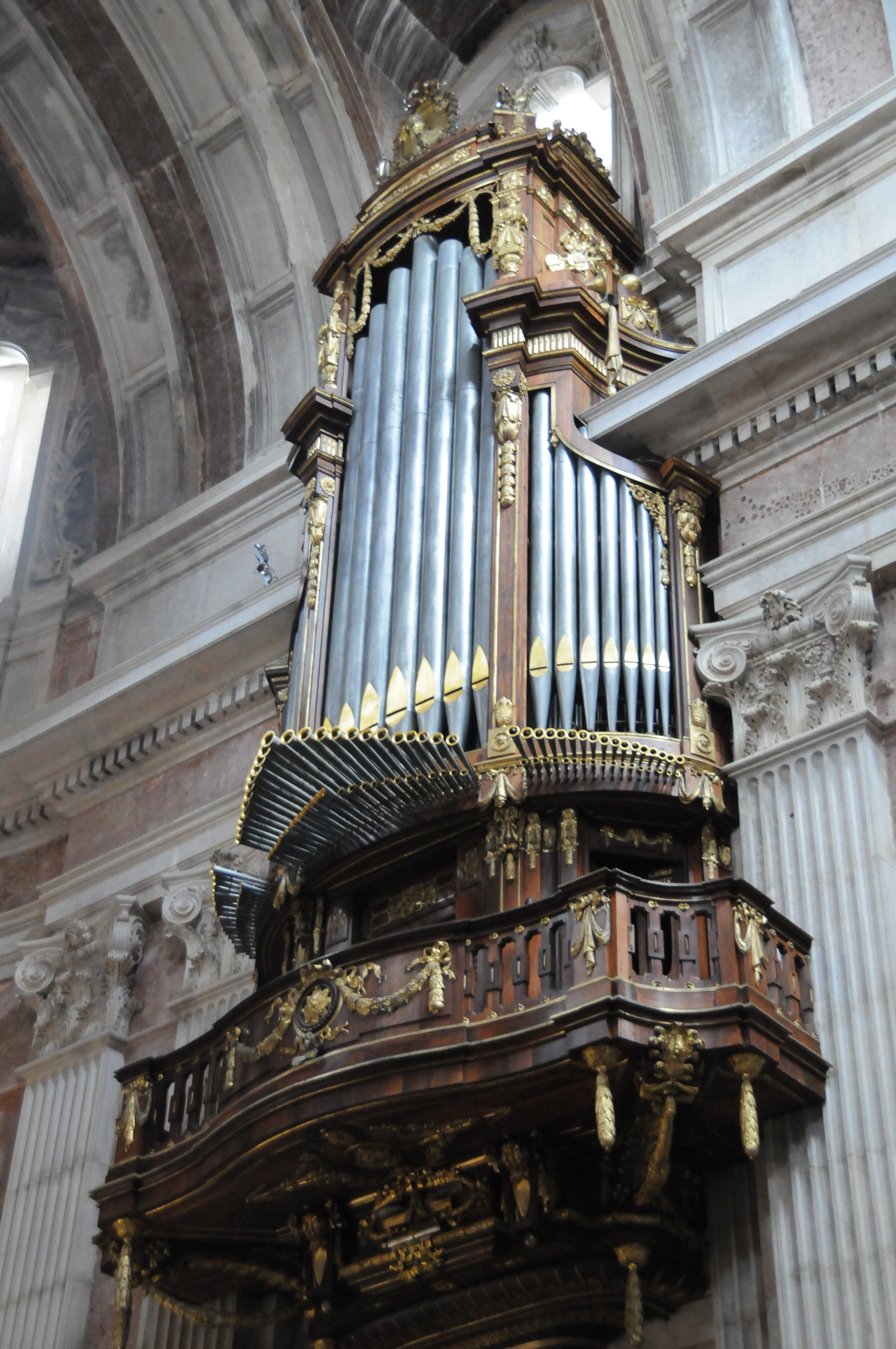
Pipe organ in Mafra.

The six organs in the Basilica of the Palace of Mafra - designed and built all at the same time, and designed to play together as well - were built by the two most important Portuguese organ builders of the time – António Xavier Machado e Cerveira and Joaquim António Peres Fontanes – and were completed between 1806 and 1807. The last two were inaugurated on 4 October 1807, and a substantial number of compositions involving all six organs were produced that year.

Shortly after their completion, the French invasion and the following exile of the Portuguese Court to Brazil led to the organs decaying for lack of maintenance. A decade later – possibly in connection with the prospect of the return of the Portuguese royal family – the six organs were subject to a major intervention. The intent of these works, undertaken by Machado e Cerveira, was not only to repair the instruments but also to enlarge them. Unfortunately, the works were interrupted a few years later (Machado e Cerveira died in 1828), and several items, such as the reassembling of the organ of São Pedro d’Alcântara, were left unfinished.

Until 1998, the organs only received minor repairs. That year, the global restoration of the ensemble, entrusted to the Portuguese organ builder Dinarte Machado, began and was concluded in 2010. This project included the reconstruction of the organ of São Pedro d’Alcântara, incorporating all the materials recovered since it was disassembled around 1820.

The six organs (two in the main chapel, two in the northern transept, and two in the southern transept), although different, have several common features. Some, like the horizontal reeds and the divided keyboard, are common among Iberian instruments of the time. Other features, like the short-resonator reeds, the Italian voce umana, and especially the double-wind chest, (allowing the quick cancellation of the plenum stops) are typical of the school of Cerveira and Fontanes.

Currently, the pipe organs are played in concerts organized by the Palace of Mafra and the Municipality of Mafra. They are also played in the religious ceremonies held in the basilica, namely the processions of the season of Lent in Mafra.
