= Igreja de Santo André (Mafra) =

Church in Mafra, Lisbon District, Portugal

Coordinates: 38.9364831°N 9.3400047°W

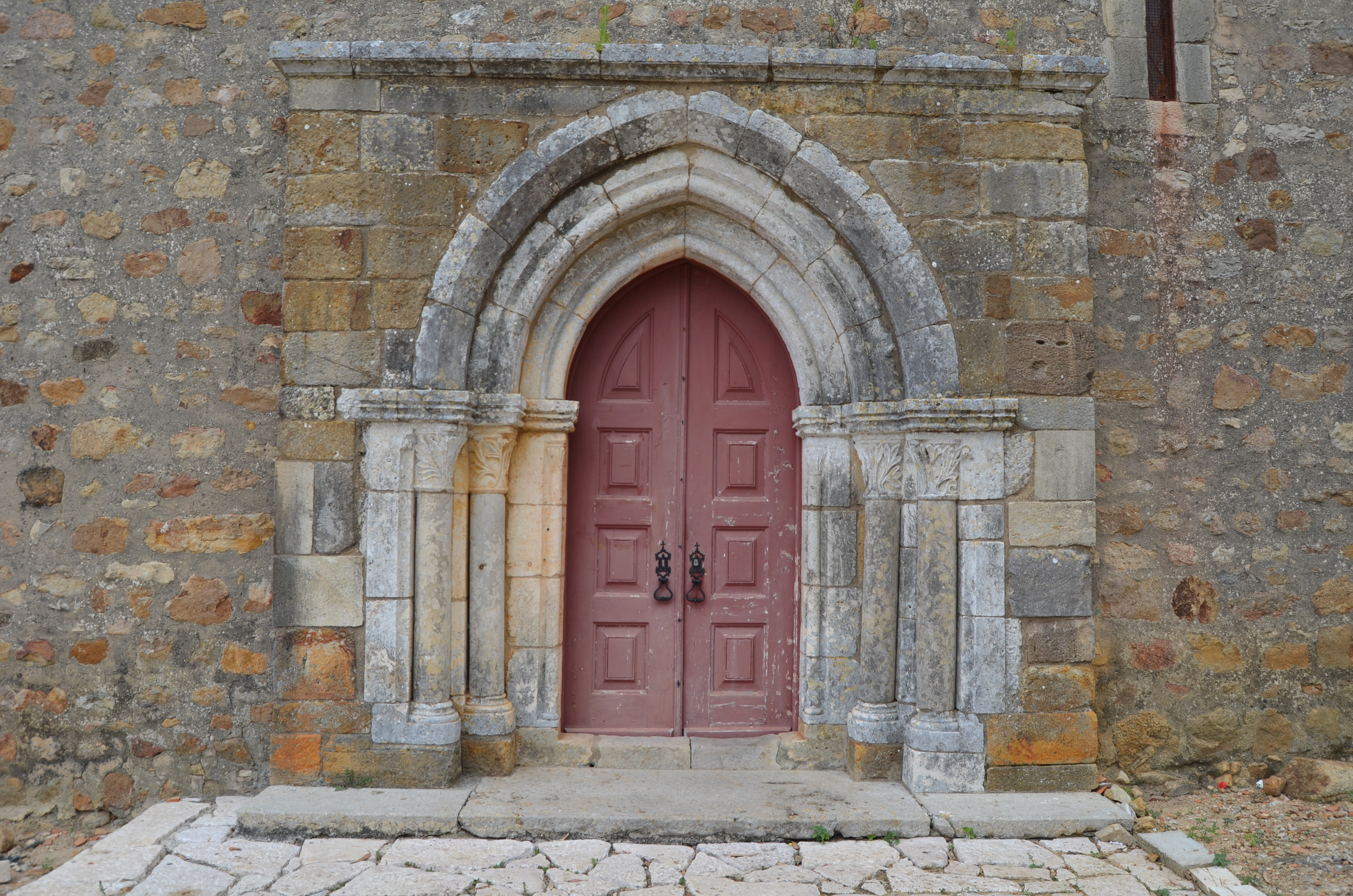
Igreja de Santo André

Igreja de Santo André is a gothic church in Mafra, Portugal. It is classified as a National Monument.
