= Fort Santa Susana =

17th Century fortress in Portugal

- Forte de Santa Susana
- Lisbon District, Near Ericeira in Portugal
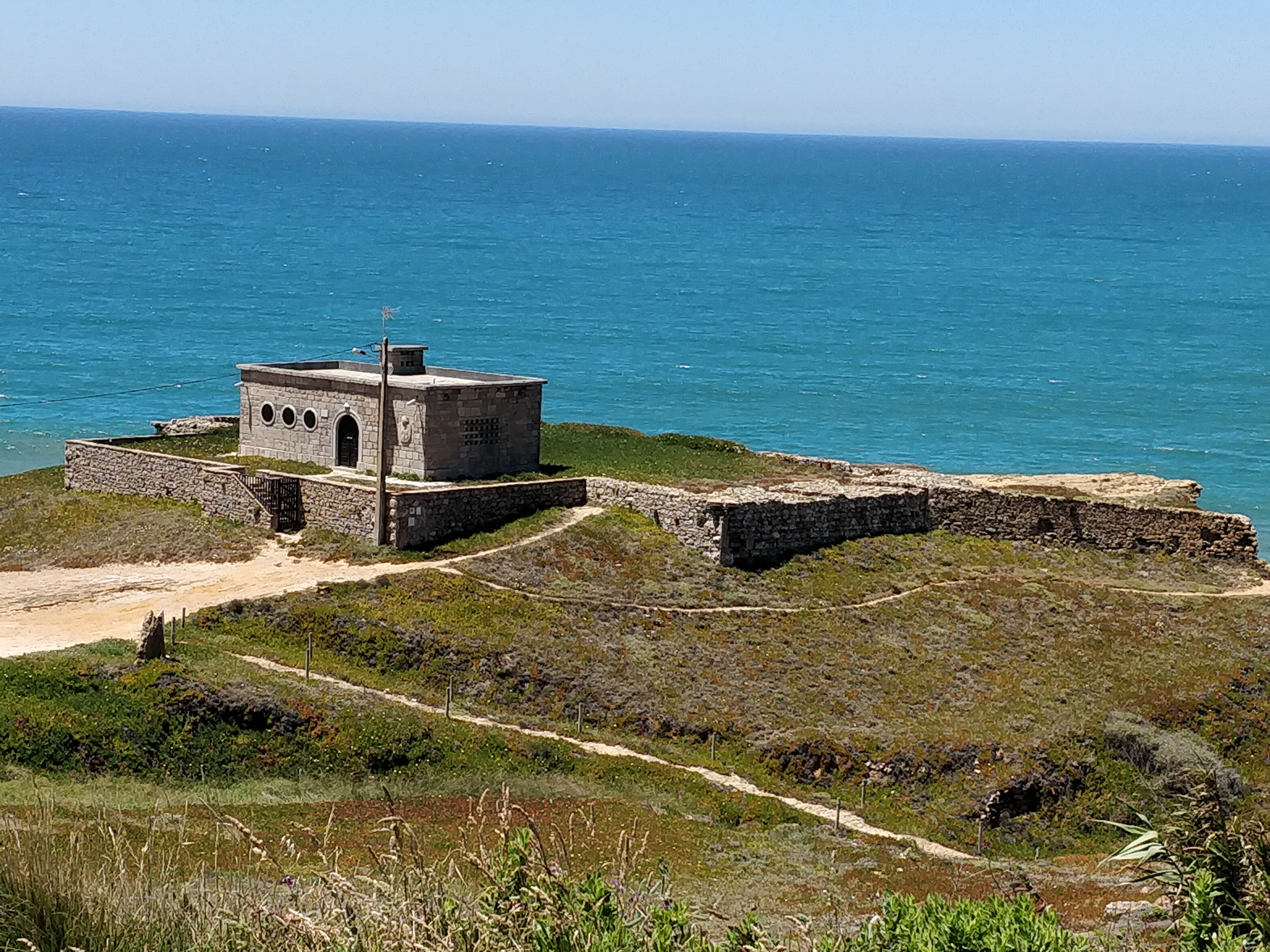
- View of the fort

Site information
- Type: Fort
- Owner: Portuguese Republic
- Open to the public: Exterior only
- Condition: Good, but threatened by coastal erosion

Location
- Coordinates: 39°00′36″N 9°25′30″W

Site history
- Built: 1640-56 (Rebuilt 1809-10)

Fort Santa Susana, also referred to as Fort São Lourenço, is located south of the beach at São Lourenço, in the parish of Santo Isidoro in the municipality of Mafra within the Lisbon District of Portugal. The fort was built during the Portuguese Restoration War (1640-68), following the instructions of the Council of War set up by King John IV. It was one of many coastal forts designed to protect against both Spanish invasion and pirates. Supervision of the construction was the responsibility of António Luís de Meneses, 1st Marquis of Marialva and 3rd Count of Cantanhede.

During the Peninsular War (1807-1814), the Fort of Santa Susana was integrated into the 2nd line of the Lines of Torres Vedras, which were defensive lines built in 1809-10 under the orders of the Duke of Wellington to defend Lisbon from invasion by the French. It served as a barracks until 1948, when it was transferred to the Guarda Fiscal (Fiscal Guard).
