= Azueira e Sobral da Abelheira =

- Civil parish
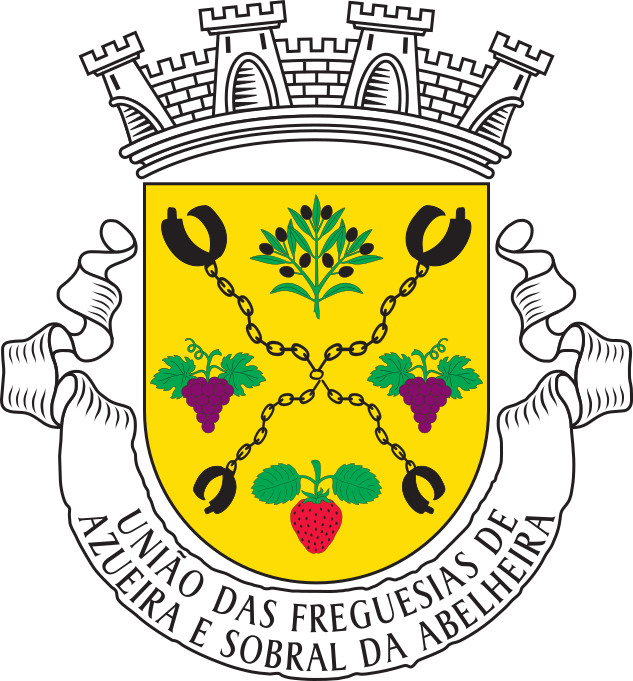
- Coat of arms

- Location in Portugal
- Coordinates: 39.007°N 9.290°W
- Country: Portugal
- Region: Lisbon
- Metropolitan area: Lisbon
- District: Lisbon
- Municipality: Mafra

Area
  - Total: 30.63 km^{2} (11.83 sq mi)

Population (2011)
  - Total: 4,316
  - Density: 140/km^{2} (360/sq mi)
- Time zone: UTC+00:00 (WET)
  - Summer (DST): UTC+01:00 (WEST)

Azueira e Sobral da Abelheira is a civil parish in the municipality of Mafra, Portugal. It was formed in 2013 by the merger of the former parishes Azueira and Sobral da Abelheira. The population in 2011 was 4,316, in an area of 30.63 km².

== Patrimony ==
- Solar da Quinta do Pato ou Quinta da Família Pato e Cunha ou Quinta do Pato
- Capela de Santa Cristina e Cruzeiro adjacente
- Igreja de São Pedro de Grilhões
- Igreja Paroquial
- Ermida de Nossa Senhora do Codeçal
- Tapada Nacional de Mafra
- Quinta da Abelheira
- Quinta dos Brigadeiros
