= Mafra, Portugal =

Mafra
- Municipality
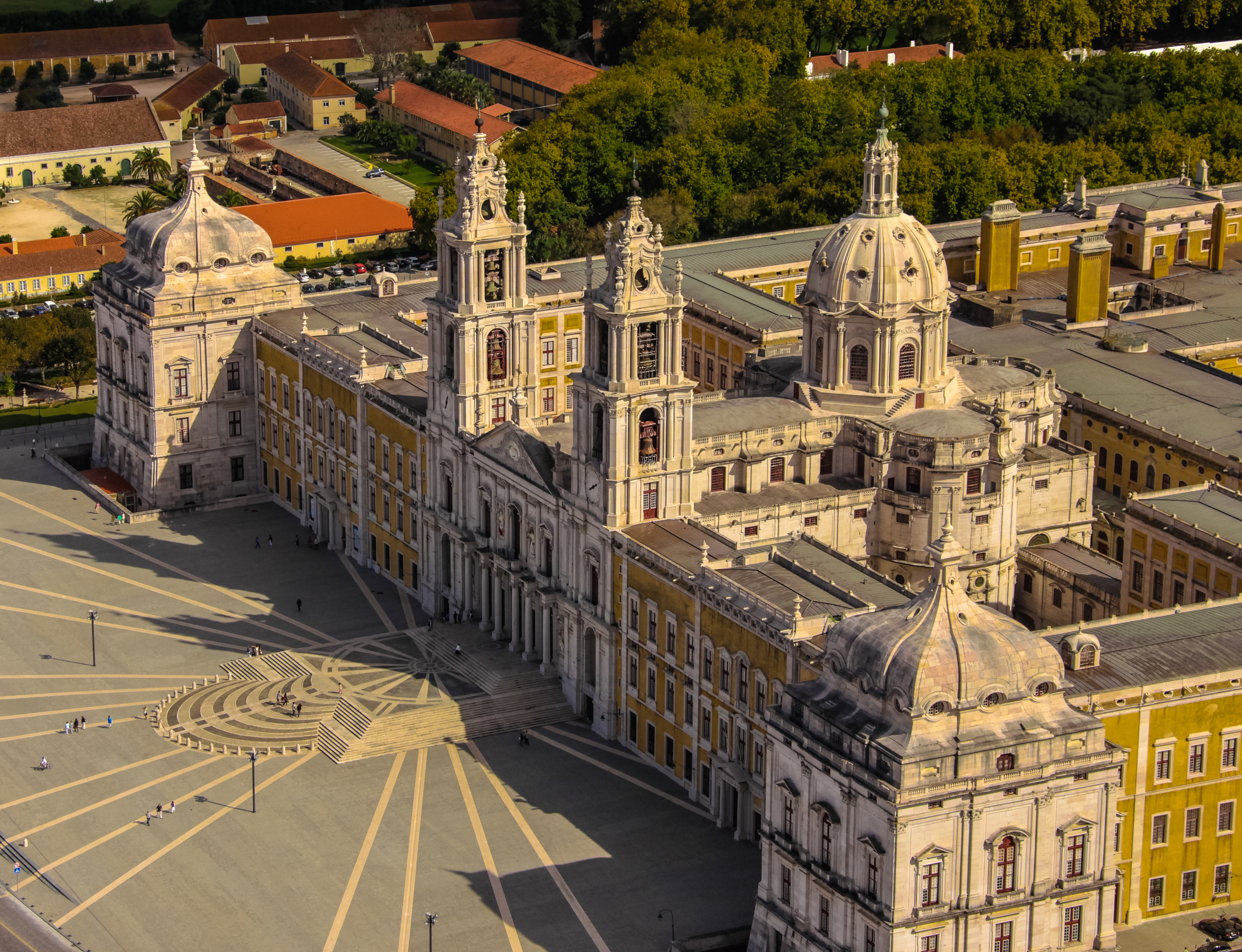
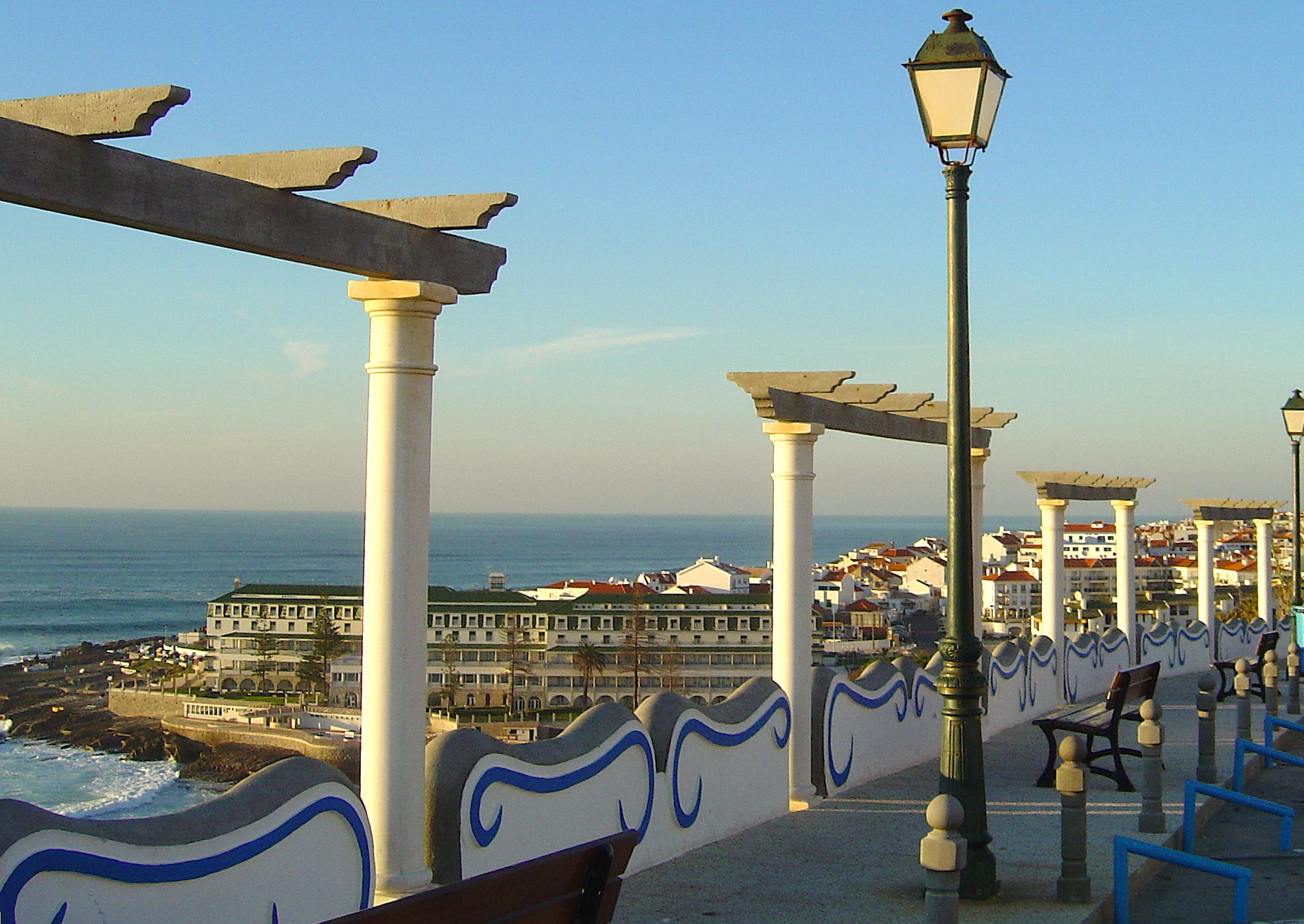
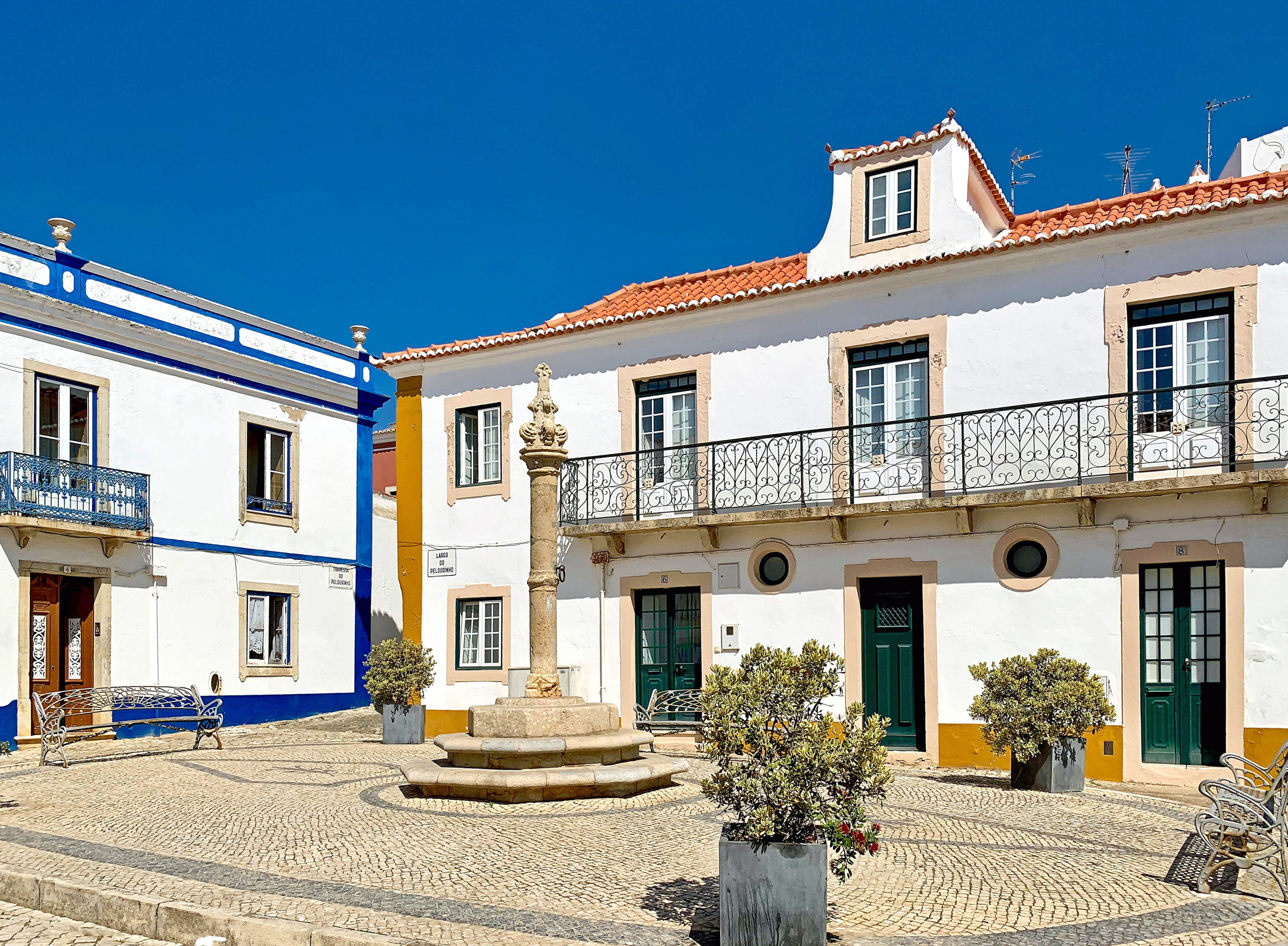
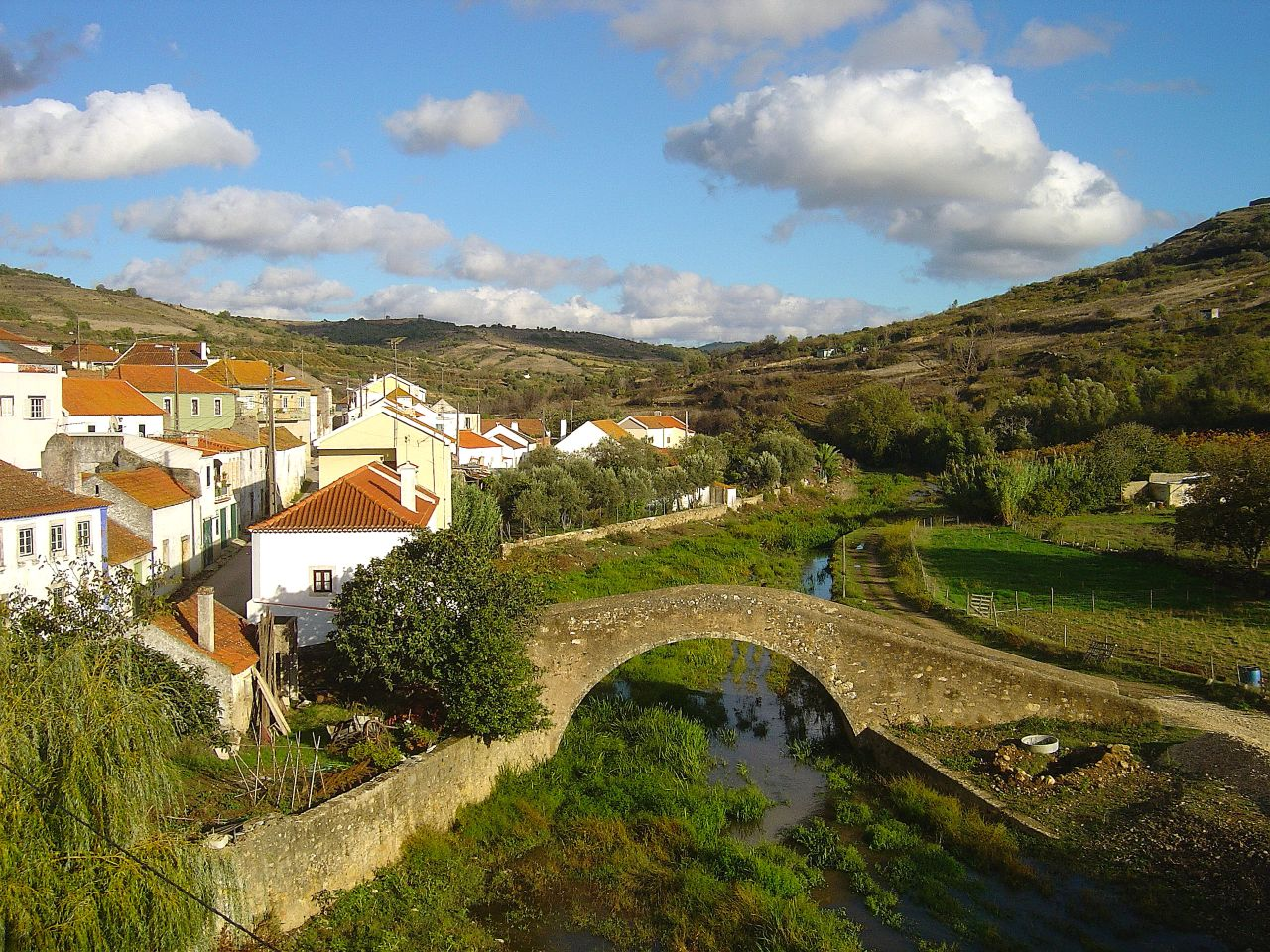
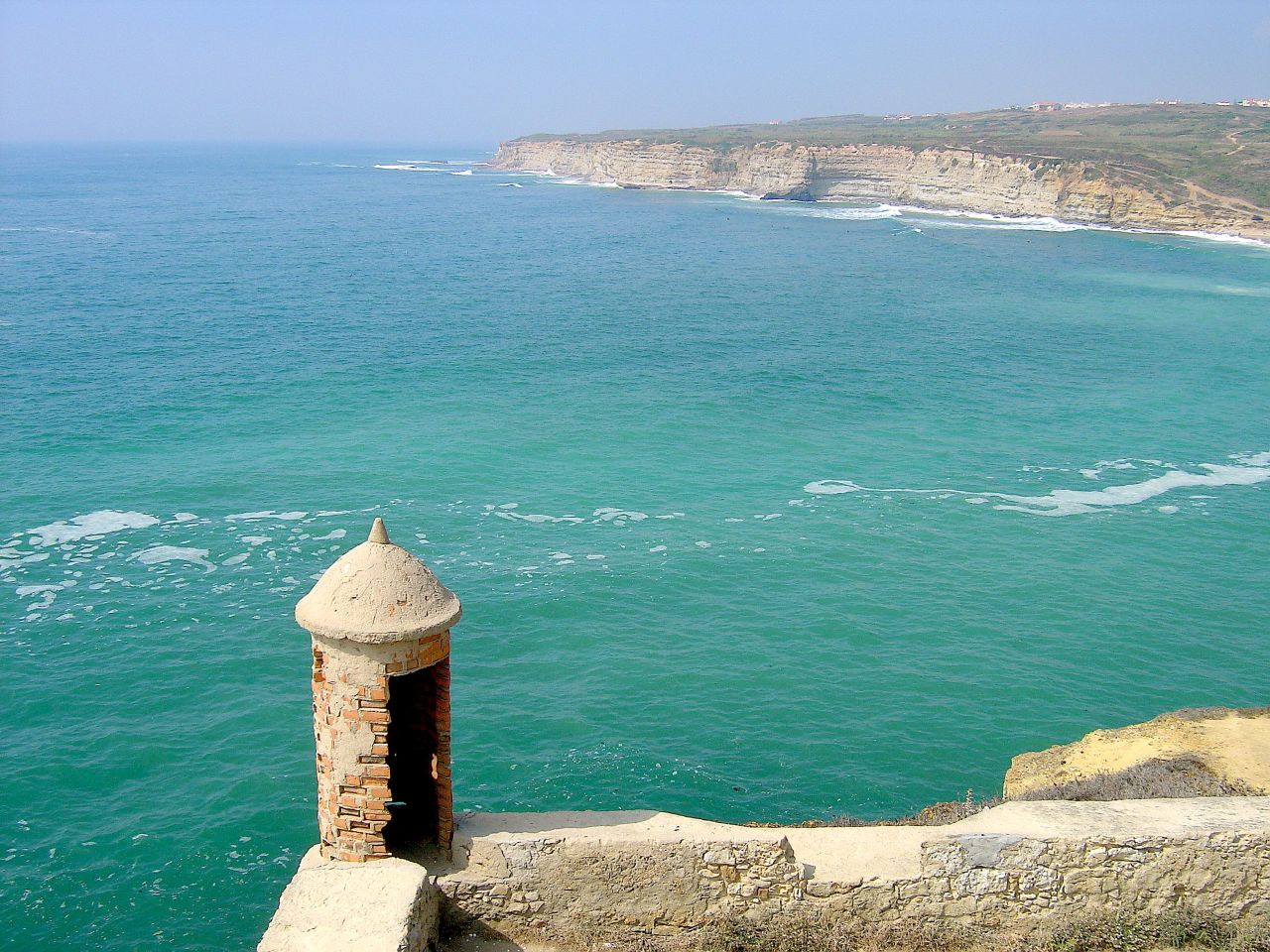

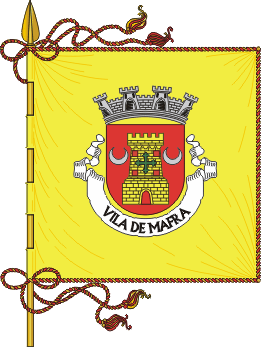
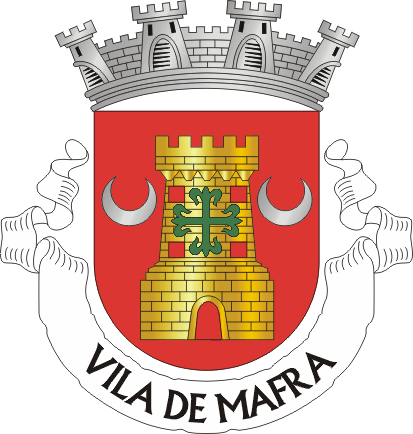
- Flag Coat of arms
- Interactive map of Mafra
- Location in Portugal
- Coordinates: 38°56′28″N 9°19′55″W
- Country: Portugal
- Region: Lisbon
- Metropolitan area: Lisbon
- District: Lisbon
- Parishes: 11

Government
  - President: Hugo Luís (PSD)

Area
  - Total: 291.66 km^{2} (112.61 sq mi)
- Elevation: 115 m (377 ft)

Population (2011)
  - Total: 76,685
  - Density: 262.93/km^{2} (680.98/sq mi)
- Time zone: UTC+00:00 (WET)
  - Summer (DST): UTC+01:00 (WEST)
- Postal code: 2644
- Area code: 261
- Patron: Santo André
- Website: www.cm-mafra.pt

Mafra (Portuguese pronunciation: [ˈmafɾɐ]) is a city and a municipality in the district of Lisbon, on the west coast of Portugal, and part of the urban agglomeration of the Greater Lisbon subregion. The population in 2011 was 76,685, in an area of 291.66 km^{2}.

It is mostly known for the sumptuous Mafra National Palace inscribed as a UNESCO World Heritage Site. Built in the baroque style, the Mafra National Palace also inspired Portuguese Nobel Prize laureate José Saramago to write his novel Baltasar and Blimunda (Memorial do Convento). Other points of interest around the municipality include the Tapada Nacional de Mafra (also part of the UNESCO site), an enclosed wildlife and game reserve, and Ericeira's World Surf Reserve, the second in the world.

== History ==
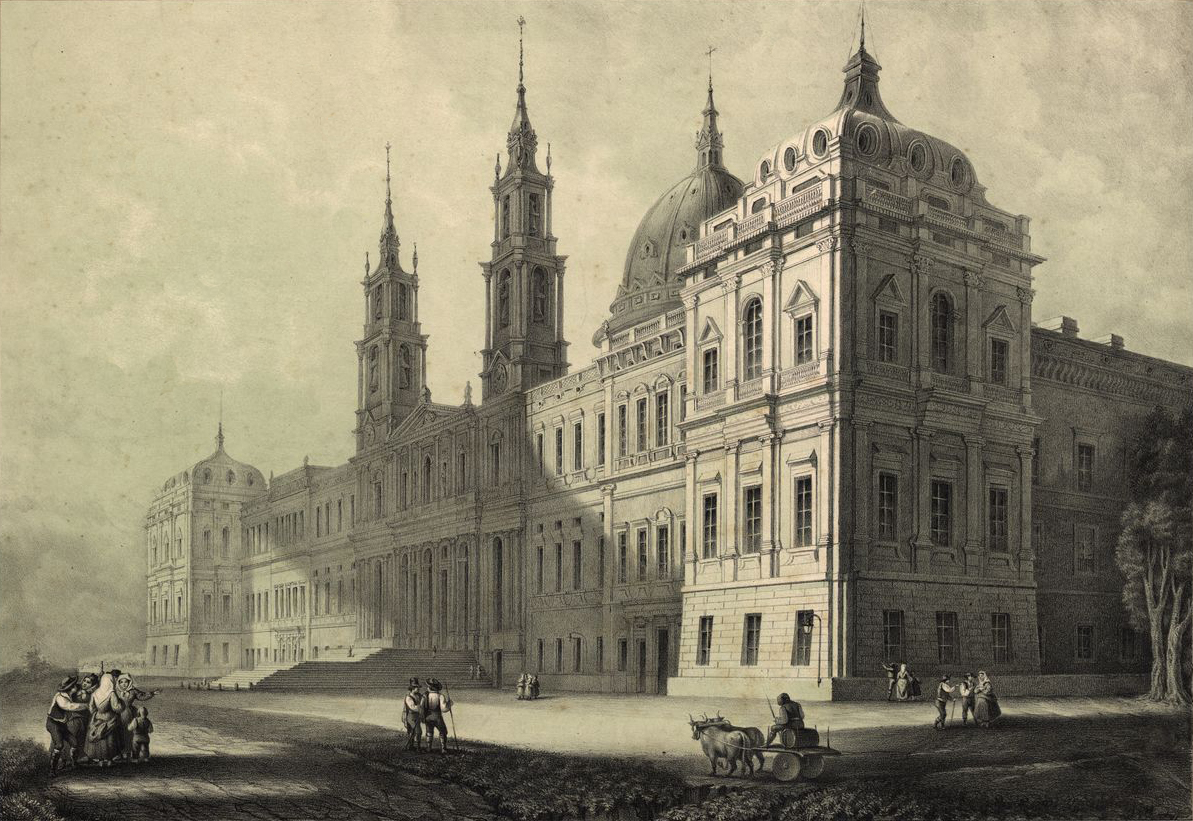
The massive façade of the Mafra Palace dwarfing the country-folk that lived in its shadow

The earliest archaeological remnants discovered in Mafra date to an early settlement of this region in the Neolithic period. In Seixosa, civil parish of Encarnação, in an area that was once a beach, there were archaeological remnants from the Paleolithic period, that indicate one of the oldest human presences in Europe. Similar human vestiges were discovered along the beach of São Julião, including specifically shell mounds produced by Mesolithic communities in the parish of Carvoeira. Although many of these remnants have been discovered submerged along the coast, they have been dated to 7000 B.C. During the Neolithic (5000 B.C.), the first agro-pastoral communities began to appear, remaining in small groups in strategically defensible locations. This includes sites in Igreja Nova, such as Penedo do Lexim (considered an important point in comprehending the Neolithic and Copper Age Iberian settlements) and occupied during the final part of the Neolithic, Chalcolithic and Bronze Age. Other structures from the Neolithic, today missing, such as the castle of Cheleiros or dolmens, whose name remains the only proof there is existence, such as Antas-Azueira and Antas-Gradil. In addition to the Penedo do Lexim, also in the Serra do Socorro and Tituaria, as funerary tombs from the Chalcolithic.

Tombstones, altars, tombs, coins, bins, ceramics and glass from the Roman era have been found in almost all parishes of the municipality. These dates back to the first and fourth century, including the Roman road connecting Sintra and Peniche, which crosses Mafra, intersecting the Cheleiros, Mafra, Ericeira, Paço de Ilhas and S. Domingos da Fanga da Fé (where portions of the road have been conserved). In Cheleiros and Carvoeira there are two bridges constructed by the Romans. One of these, a bridge in Santo Isidoro (as well as a 100-metre portion of the road) that was part of the Sintra-Peniche accessway, is a reflection of the areas Romanization. An important agriculture centre during the Roman occupation, anthropologists have discovered Roman coins of the eras of Augustus (27 - 14 B.C.), Claudius (41 - 54) and Magnus Maximo (383 - 388). Although it is unclear the area's importance within Olissipo, its agricultural contributions may have contributed to its strong settlement during the period. Wine, oil and vegetables were easily commercialized across the accessway and along the rivers of Cheleiros, Ilhas and Safarujo, which were navigable until the Middle Ages.

The occupation by the Visigoths occurred after the 5th century, until the arrival of the Moors in 711, with few remnants discovered. An inscription, encountered in the parochial church of Cheleiros, a frieze in Alcainça and paeleo-Christian funerary tomb, adapted as a bunk within the Quinta da Corredoura in Mafra are the only current manifestations of these peoples.

It is certain that the built-up urban area of Mafra was once a fortified community, with the area of Rua das Tecedeiras being the best example of the walls still being visible. The limits of the castle, which was implanted on the Neolithic settlement, was successively reoccupied until the Iron Age, and taking up the entirety of the old village. This includes the space limited in the east by the Largo Coronel Brito Gorjão, the south by the Rua das Tecedeiras, west by the Palácio dos Marqueses de Ponte de Lima and north by the Rua Mafra Detrás do Castelo. A dense forest that existed until the 20th century, in Quinta da Cerca in this area, that protected and sheltered the settlement from winds.

=== Kingdom ===
Although Mafra was occupied by the Moors until 1147, when the area was taken by Afonso Henriques, remnants from the Moorish occupation are rare. There are suggestions that many of the churches were once mosques, such as the Matriz Church of Cheleiros, the Church of Santo André and the sanctuary of Serra do Socorro. The origin of the local toponymy Mafra is unclear, but evolved from variations of Mafara (1189), Malfora (1201) and, later, Mafora (1288). Some suggest its origin came from the Turanian Great Ara, a female fertility cult that may have existed along the rim of the early village. Others suggest that it developed from the Arabic Mahfara, which means pit, which presumed that the location was implanted within a pit, a fact that was disproved by the Arabist David Lopes. The town is, in fact, located on a hill, with two ravines (Rio Gordo and Rio dos Couros) limiting the area around it.

In 1189/1190 the village was donated by King Sancho I to the Bishop of Silves, D. Nicolau, who received the first foral (charter) a year later. This foral was followed by charters to Cheleiros in 1195, Ericeira in 1229 and Vila ao Gradil in 1327.

During the Manueline era many of the national forals were re-issued, especially after the 11th and 15th century. Between 1513 and 1516, King Manuel I issued a new foral to Mafra, Ericeira and Cheleiros, and in 1519, conceded a foral to Enxara dos Cavaleiros, while confirming a foral to Gradil (then originally donated by Afonso IV of Portugal in 1327). During the Manueline reforms, the municipalities that received these forals constructed pillories or required to refurbished their administrative markers. In the census of 18 September 1527, there was an estimated 191 residents, of which only four couples lived within the village. The reign of Manuel I was instrumental in influencing the religious architecture of the region; it is present in many of the churches, such as Nossa Senhora da Oliveira in Sobral da Abelheira, Nossa Senhora do Reclamador in Cheleiros, Nossa Senhora da Conceição in Igreja Nova, São Miguel in Milharado, Santa Eulália in Santo Estevão das Galés, or São Silvestre in Gradil. These architectural details are apparent in the doorways, vaulted ceilings and baptismal fountains. Symbols of judicial power, these markers became posts for notices, orders or commands from Corte, and were later refurbished, repositioned or lost over time.

When, in 1717, King John V began construction of the Mafra Palace, written by the Chief Architect of the Kingdom João Frederico Ludovice Mafra was barely a few hamlets that huddled around the monument. The era was also marked by the construction of a garden (Portuguese: Jardim do Cerco) and the establishment of the royal hunting park (Portuguese: Tapada de Mafra); building projects continued throughout the reigns of Kings Joseph I (the construction and completion of the Mafra Palace), John VI (the interiors of the Palace) and Ferdinand (the redesign of the Jardim do Cerco). Yet, William Beckford, writing in August 1787, noted that Mafra was of little interest, and nothing more than a few rooftops nestled in mountains.

During the 19th century, the population began to grow around the palace, but this remained generally a rural community (an aspect that would continue until the 20th century). José Mangens in 1936 echoed similar indications of Mafra in writing about old Rua dos Arcipestres, noting: "...Mafra offers nothing interesting and looks more like a hinterland village with its huts and ruined portals typical backyard, shielded with old cans...".

As Guilherme José Ferreira de Assunção later wrote, after a few visits, Queen Maria realized the advantages of establishing a military contingent in the Convent of Mafra, which she initiated. This change transformed the region and its people, who lived in a precarious conditions of existence. After 1840, the Convent was occupied by the army. By 1859, 4000 troops would enlist in the official military boot-camp (Portuguese: Depósito Geral de Recrutas), established by King Pedro V. Unfortunately, the institution was abolished in the following year, when 94 recruits died from an infectious disease. But, from 1848 to 1859 and from 1870 t0 1873, the convent continued to house the Royal Military College (Portuguese: Real Colégio Militar).

In 1887 the Infantry and Cavalry School (Portuguese: Escola Prática de Infantaria e Cavalaria) and, a year later, in Tapada, a firing range was established, that was later frequented by King Carlos, an enthusiast of shooting.

During the French invasion of Portugal in 1807, Napoleon made the Mafra Palace headquarters and garrison. Part of the army headed for Peniche and Torres Vedras under orders from General Luison, the remaining forces garrisoned in the Palace and Convent, while the executive staff requisitioned homes in the village. This lasted nine months, until 2 September 1807, when British forces were able to extricate the French from their positions. Meanwhile, Portuguese engineers, allied to British forces constructed a system of fortresses north of Lisbon, to secure the defence of the capital and expel the French. The Lines of Torres Vedras, as they were known, passed through the municipality of Mafra, and were constructed in 1809 and 1810. Of the 156 fortresses, 48 were located within Mafra municipality, and represented the second line of defence including sites in Malveira, Gradil, Ribamar, Carvoeira, Mafra and Ericeira. In the main only vestiges of these forts and redoubts remain, but those that are still in good condition or have been restored include the forts of Feira, Santa Susana, and Zambujal. Within the Tapada there were forts in Sunível, Milhariça, Juncal and Silvério, while a group of forts followed the left bank of the Ribeira de Safarujo to Ribamar. In the south, the last line of defence, should the French breach the defences, were the forts of Carvoeira, São Julião and Zambujal.

=== Republic ===
On 5 October 1910, the Mafra Palace was also the scene for an episode of the Republican Revolution that occurred in Lisbon. King Manuel II fleeing from the coup in Lisbon, took refuge and over-nighted in the Palace of Mafra. The next day they abandoned the palace, by car, travelling with his mother and grandmother to the shores of Praia dos Pescadores in Ericeira, where the royal yacht D. Amélia would take them onto Gibraltar and exile. Later that month, on 20 October, a group of monarchists gathered in the Largo D. João V with arms, where they walked to the Infantry School (Portuguese: Escola Prática de Infantaria), installing themselves in the convent, cutting the telephone wires and telegraph cables. The revolt was easily put down by the military but resulted in a collection of hundreds of people in the local jails.

In 1911, in the Depósito de Remonta e Garanhões which was later replaced by the Military Equestrian School (Portuguese: Escola Militar de Equitação) in 1950 and, seven years later, the Military Centre for Physical Education, Equestriansim and Sport (Portuguese: Centro Militar de Educação Física, Equitação e Desportos). Today, it continues to function as the Military Centre for Physical Education and Sport (Portuguese: Centro Militar de Educação Física e Desportos), since 1993, in the Largo General Conde Januário and the Infantry School (Portuguese: Escola Prática de Infantaria), in the Convent of Mafra.

== Geography ==
Historical population
| Year | Pop. | ±% |
|---|---|---|
| 1864 | 22,511 | — |
| 1878 | 22,773 | +1.2% |
| 1890 | 24,222 | +6.4% |
| 1900 | 25,021 | +3.3% |
| 1911 | 27,163 | +8.6% |
| 1920 | 27,108 | −0.2% |
| 1930 | 29,750 | +9.7% |
| 1940 | 32,341 | +8.7% |
| 1950 | 36,485 | +12.8% |
| 1960 | 35,739 | −2.0% |
| 1970 | 34,112 | −4.6% |
| 1981 | 43,899 | +28.7% |
| 1991 | 43,731 | −0.4% |
| 2001 | 54,358 | +24.3% |
| 2011 | 76,685 | +41.1% |
| 2021 | 86,515 | +12.8% |
Source: INE

Administratively, the municipality is divided into 11 freguesias:

- Azueira e Sobral da Abelheira
- Carvoeira
- Encarnação
- Enxara do Bispo, Gradil e Vila Franca do Rosário
- Ericeira
- Igreja Nova e Cheleiros
- Mafra
- Malveira e São Miguel de Alcainça
- Milharado
- Santo Isidoro
- Venda do Pinheiro e Santo Estêvão das Galés

=== Twin towns — Sister cities ===
Mafra is twinned with:

- Fréhel, Côtes-d'Armor, France
- Leimen, Baden-Württemberg, Germany
- Mindelo, São Vicente, Cape Verde, Cape Verde

== Economy ==
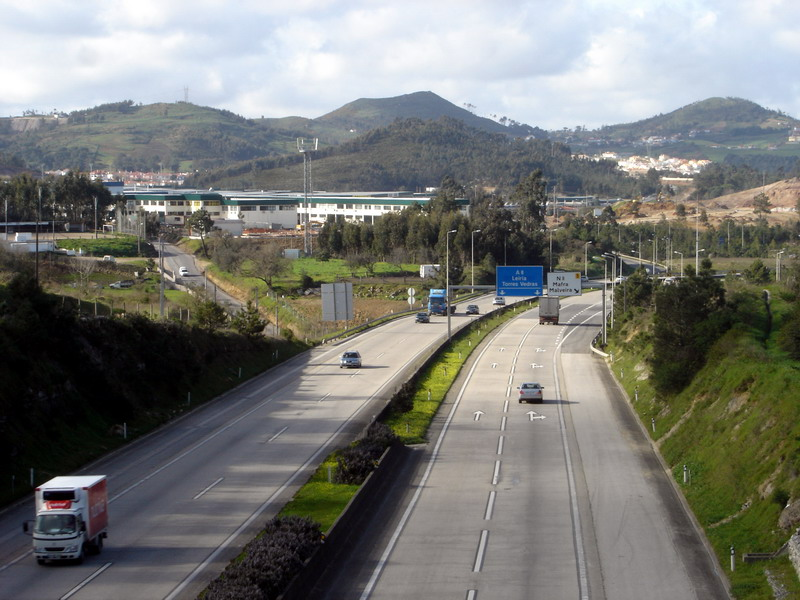
The A8 Motorway near the civil parish of Malveira

It is mainly rural with some tourist activity centred in the town Mafra and especially in the seaside town of Ericeira, which has become a key destination for national and international surfers. After the completion of the A8 motorway, linking the eastern part of the municipality to the centre of Lisbon, commuter population has increased substantially.

=== Transportation ===
The municipality of Mafra is served by a road network that includes national roadways (EN8, EN9, EN116 and EN247) and secondary municipal roadways, permitting access to the municipalities of Torres Vedras, Sintra, Loures, Sobral de Monte Agraço and Lisbon. In addition, the municipality is served by the A8 highway (Lisbon-Leiria), with connections to Venda do Pinheiro, Malveira and Enxara dos Cavaleiros, and the A21 highway (Ericeira–Mafra–Malveira), with connections to Ericeira, Mafra Oeste, Mafra Este, Malveira and Venda do Pinheiro, which have improved the movement of passengers and commerce, and consequently, the development of the region.

Public transport services are handled by the companies Barraqueiro Transportes, SA, Rodoviária de Lisboa and Isidoro Duarte with services throughout the municipality.

The rail network, served by the Linha do Oeste (Western Line), with stations in Mafra (Mafra-Gare) and Malveira, as well as flag-stops in Alcainça–Moinhos and Jeromelo, providing interurban and regional passenger and cargo services (the latter being primarily handled from the Malveira).

== Culture ==
- Traditional processions for the season of Lent

== Notable people ==
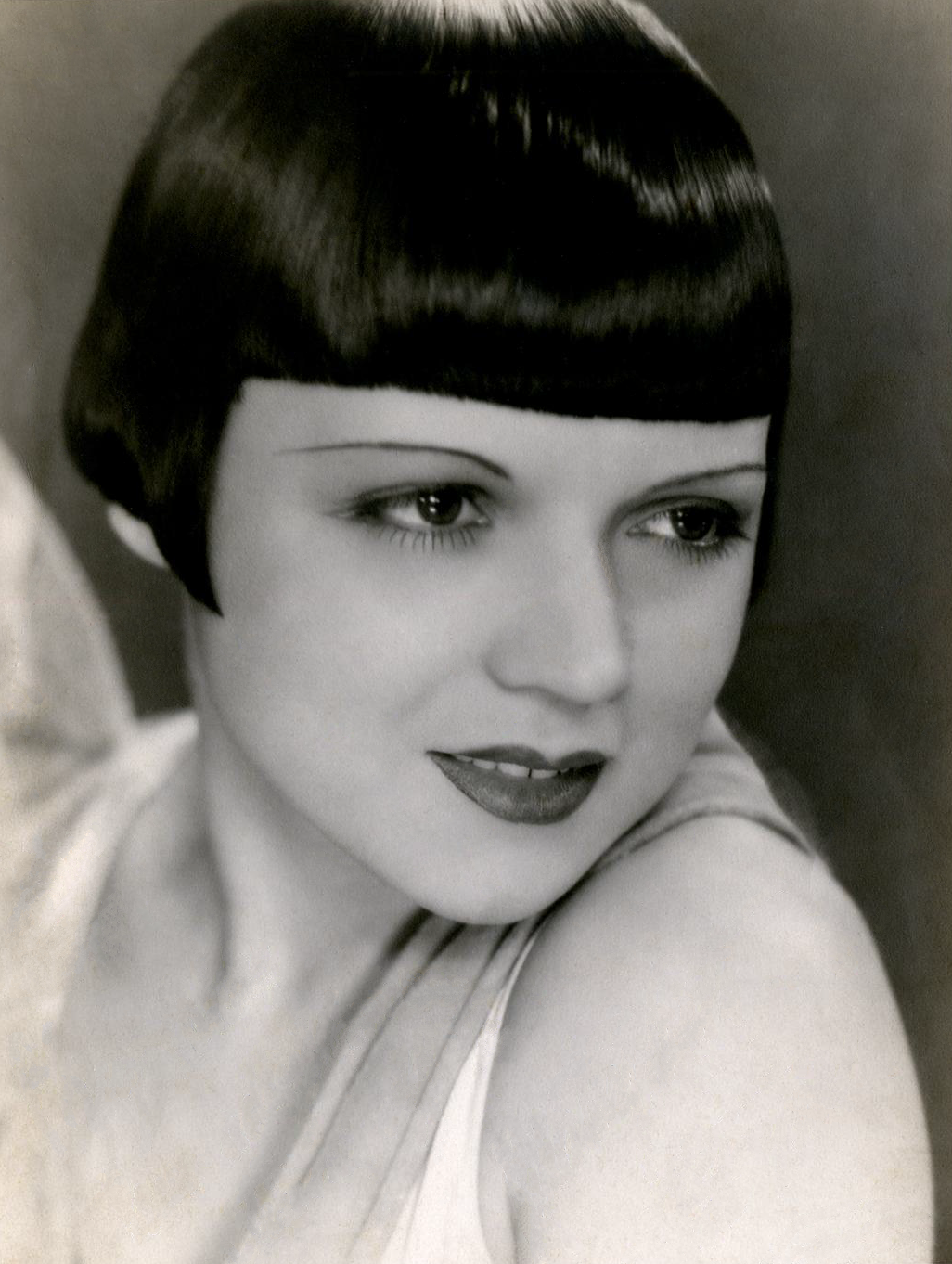
Beatriz Costa, 1934

- Cristina Ferreira (in Malveira –) a Portuguese Influencer.
- Ginés de Mafra (1493 in Mafra – 1546) a Portuguese or Spanish explorer who sailed to the Philippines in the 16th century.
- Rosa Damasceno (1845 – 1904 in Mafra) a 19th-century Portuguese actress
- Beatriz Costa (1907 in Mafra – 1996) an actress in the golden age of Portuguese cinema and an author.
- Vítor Alves (1935 in Mafra – 2011) a Portuguese soldier and politician.
- Pedro Espinha (born 1965 in Mafra) a retired football goalkeeper with over 397 club caps and 6 for Portugal
- Alexandre Leitão (born 1979 in Mafra) a Portuguese footballer
- Pedro Bonifácio (born 1985 in Mafra) a Portuguese footballer with over 330 club caps

== Gallery ==
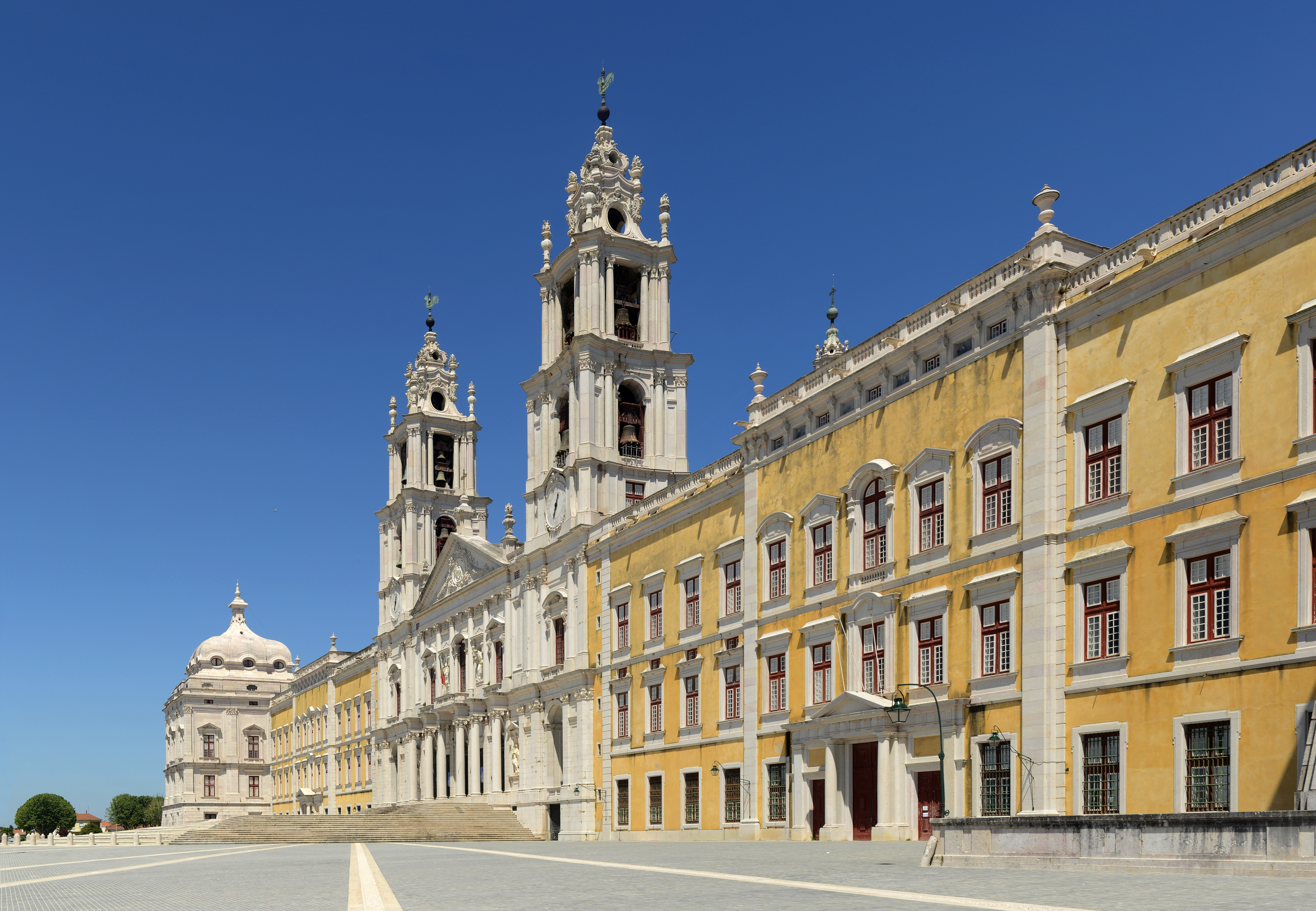
Mafra National Palace

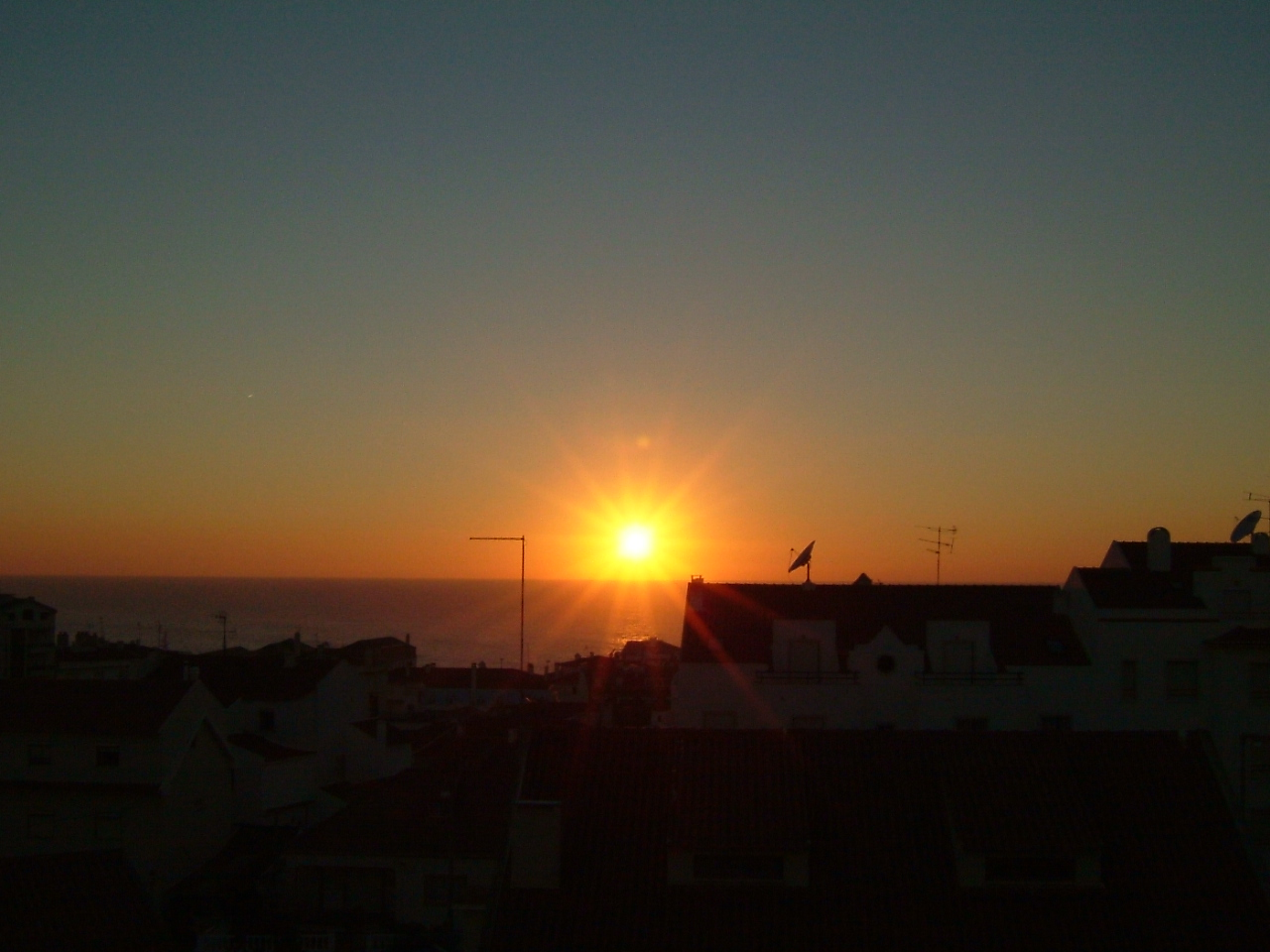
Sunset at Ericeira

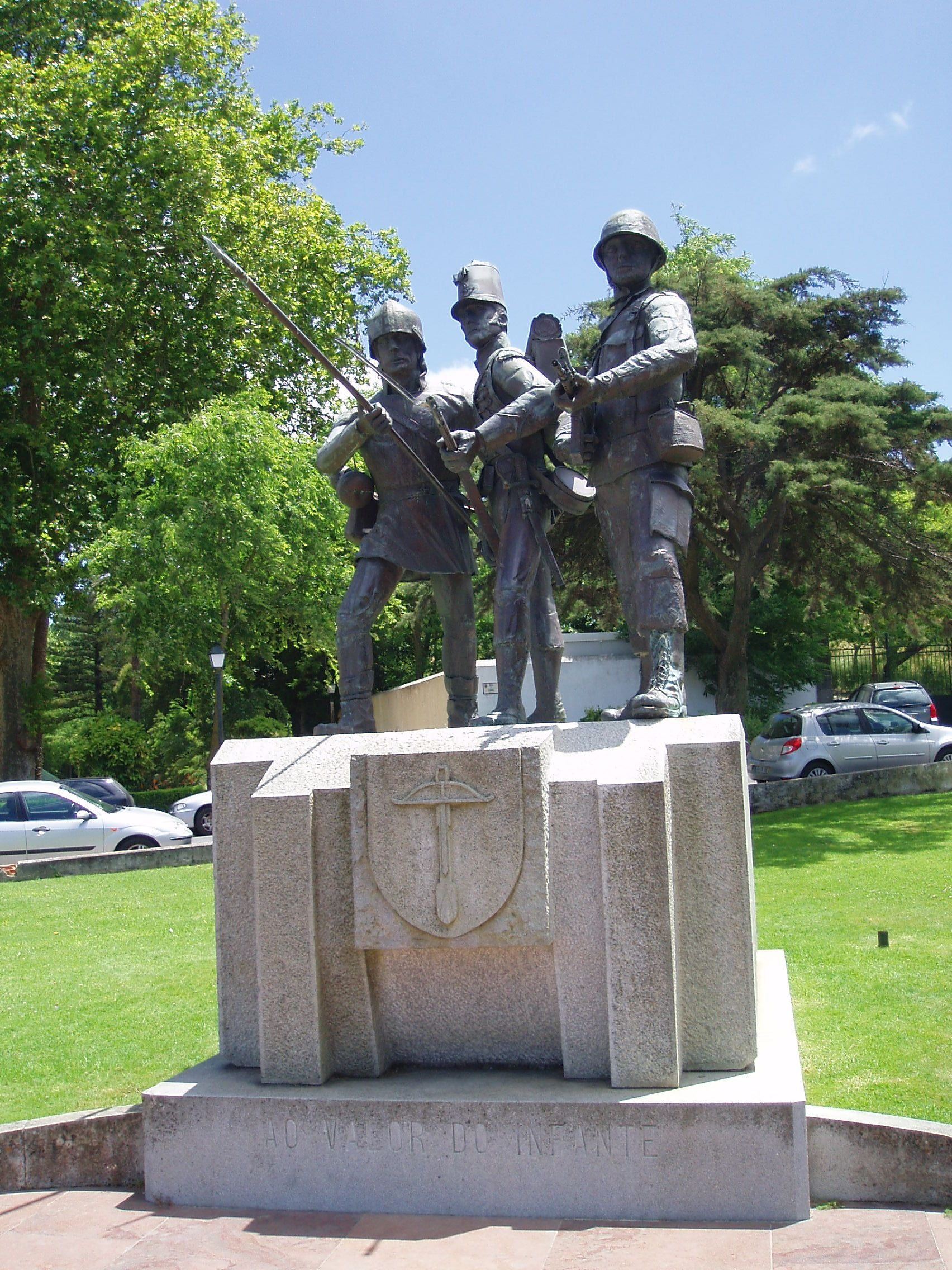
War memorial in Mafra
