= Palace of Mafra =

Historic baroque and neoclassical palace-monastery in Mafra, Portugal

National Palace of Mafra
- Palácio Nacional de Mafra
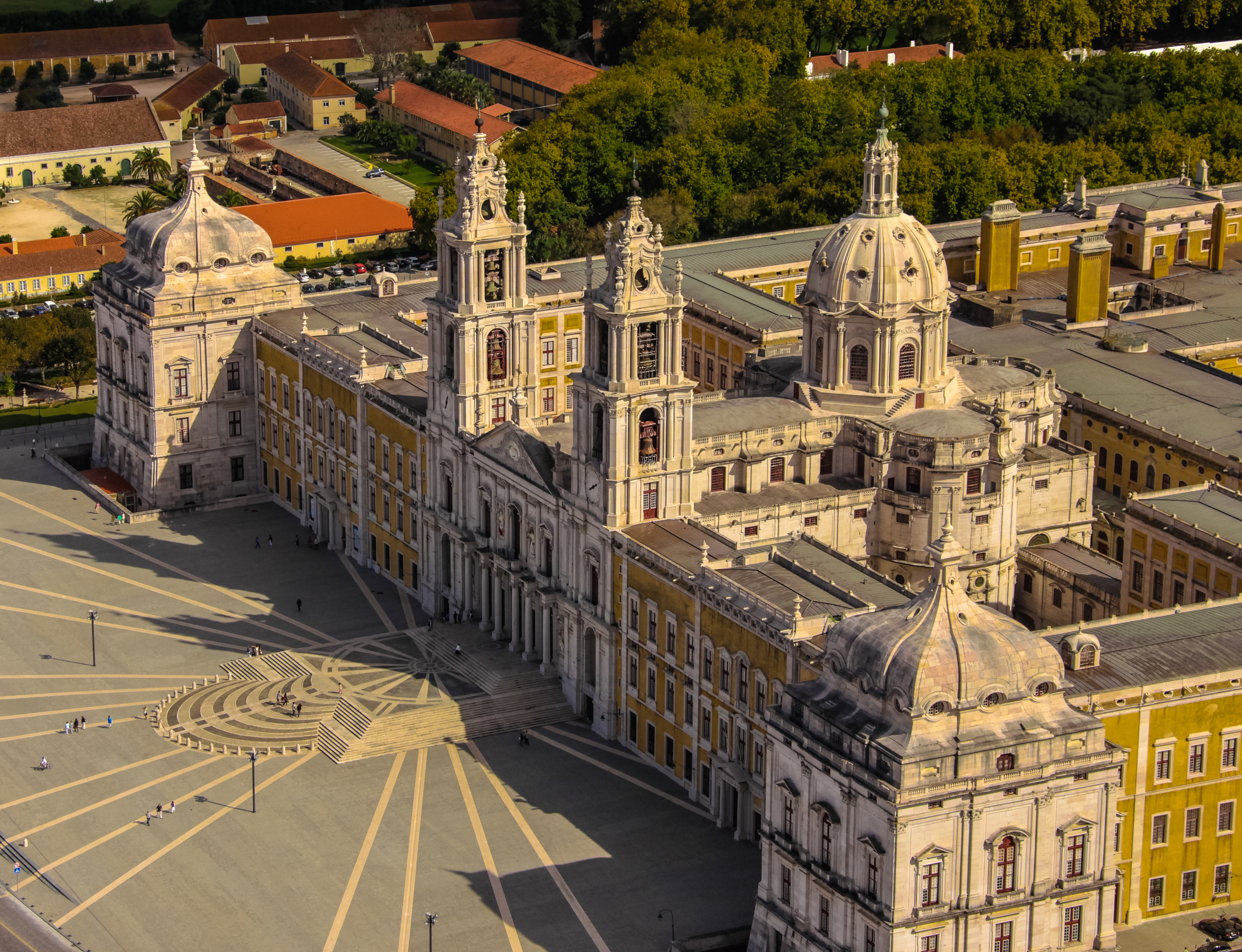
- Aerial view of the palace and convent

General information
- Location: Mafra, Portugal
- Coordinates: 38°56′13″N 9°19′33″W

UNESCO World Heritage Site
- Official name: Royal Building of Mafra – Palace, Basilica, Convent, Cerco Garden and Hunting Park (Tapada)
- Criteria: Cultural: (iv)
- Reference: 1573
- Inscription: 2019 (43rd Session)
- Area: 1,213.17 ha (2,997.8 acres)
- Buffer zone: 693.239 ha (1,713.03 acres)

Portuguese National Monument
- Type: Non-movable
- Criteria: National Monument
- Designated: 10 January 1907
- Reference no.: IPA.00006381

The Palace of Mafra (Portuguese: Palácio de Mafra), also known as the Palace-Convent of Mafra and the Royal Building of Mafra (Real Edifício de Mafra), is a monumental Baroque and Neoclassical palace-monastery located in Mafra, Portugal, some 28 kilometres from Lisbon. Construction began in 1717 under King John V of Portugal and was completed in 1755.

The palace was classified as a National Monument in 1910 and was also a finalist in the Seven Wonders of Portugal. On 7 July 2019, the Royal Building of Mafra – Palace, Basilica, Convent, Cerco Garden and Hunting Park (Tapada) was inscribed as a UNESCO World Heritage Site.

== History ==
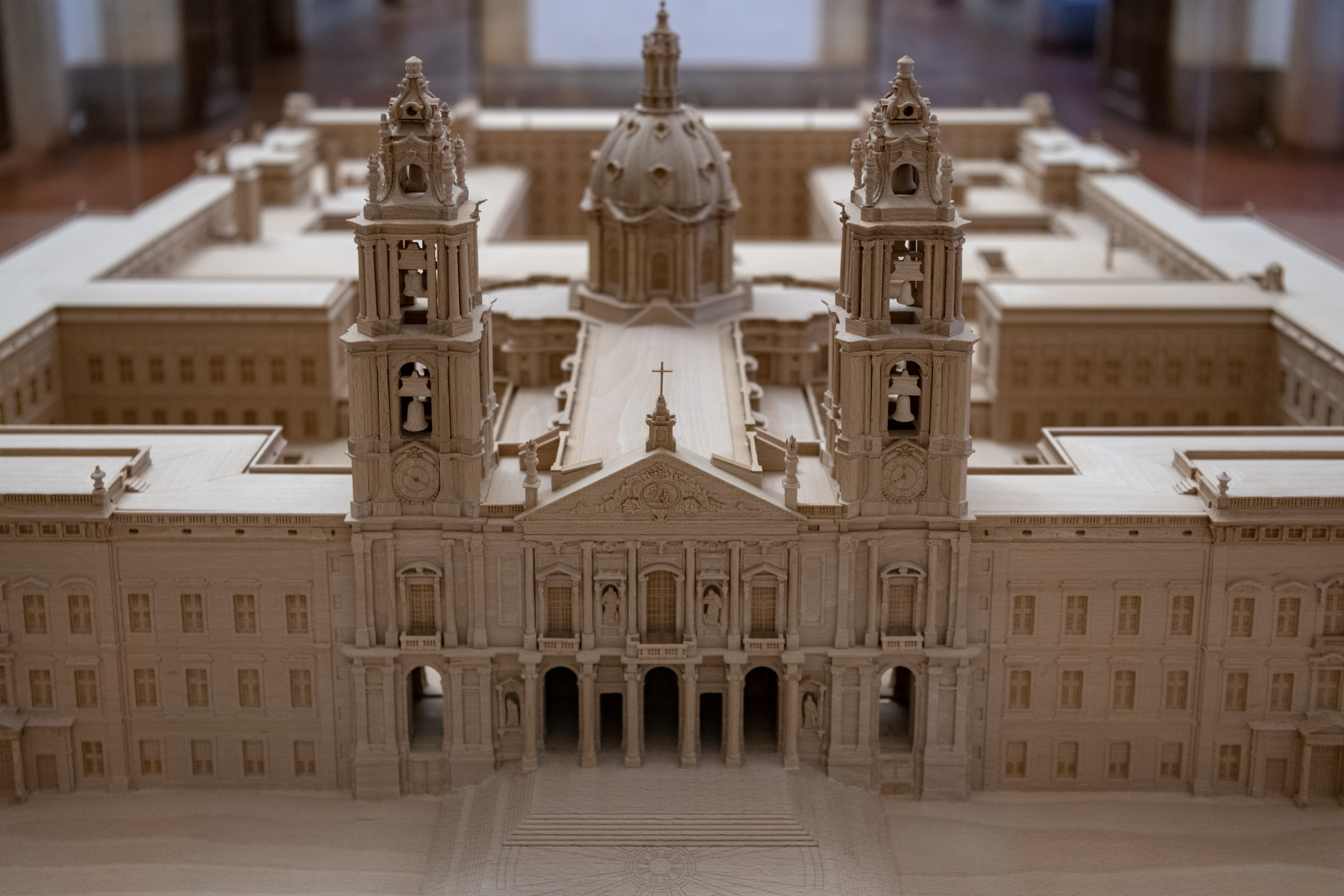
Scale model of the Royal Building of Mafra in the palace museum.

High-angle view of the model from the rear, showing the palace's symmetrical structure.

The palace, which also served as a Franciscan friary, was built during the reign of King John V (1717–1750), as consequence of a vow the king made in 1711, to build a convent if his wife, Maria Anna of Austria, gave him offspring. The birth of his first daughter the Infanta Barbara of Portugal, prompted construction of the palace to begin. The palace was conveniently located near royal hunting preserves, and was usually a secondary residence for the royal family.

The construction was funded in large part from the proceeds of Colonial Brazil, where gold and then diamonds were mined in vast quantities.

This vast complex, largely built of Lioz stone, is among the most sumptuous Baroque buildings in Portugal and at 40,000 m², one of the largest royal palaces. Designed by the German architect João Frederico Ludovice, the palace was built symmetrically from a central axis, occupied by the basilica, and continues lengthwise through the main façade until two major towers. The structures of the convent are located behind the main façade. The building also includes a major library, with about 30,000 rare books. The basilica is decorated with several Italian statues and includes six historical pipe organs and two carillons, composed of 98 bells.

=== Construction ===
The exact site was chosen in 1713 and purchased in 1716. Construction began by the laying of the first stone on November 17, 1717, with a grand ceremony in the presence of the king, his entire court and the Cardinal Patriarch of Lisbon.

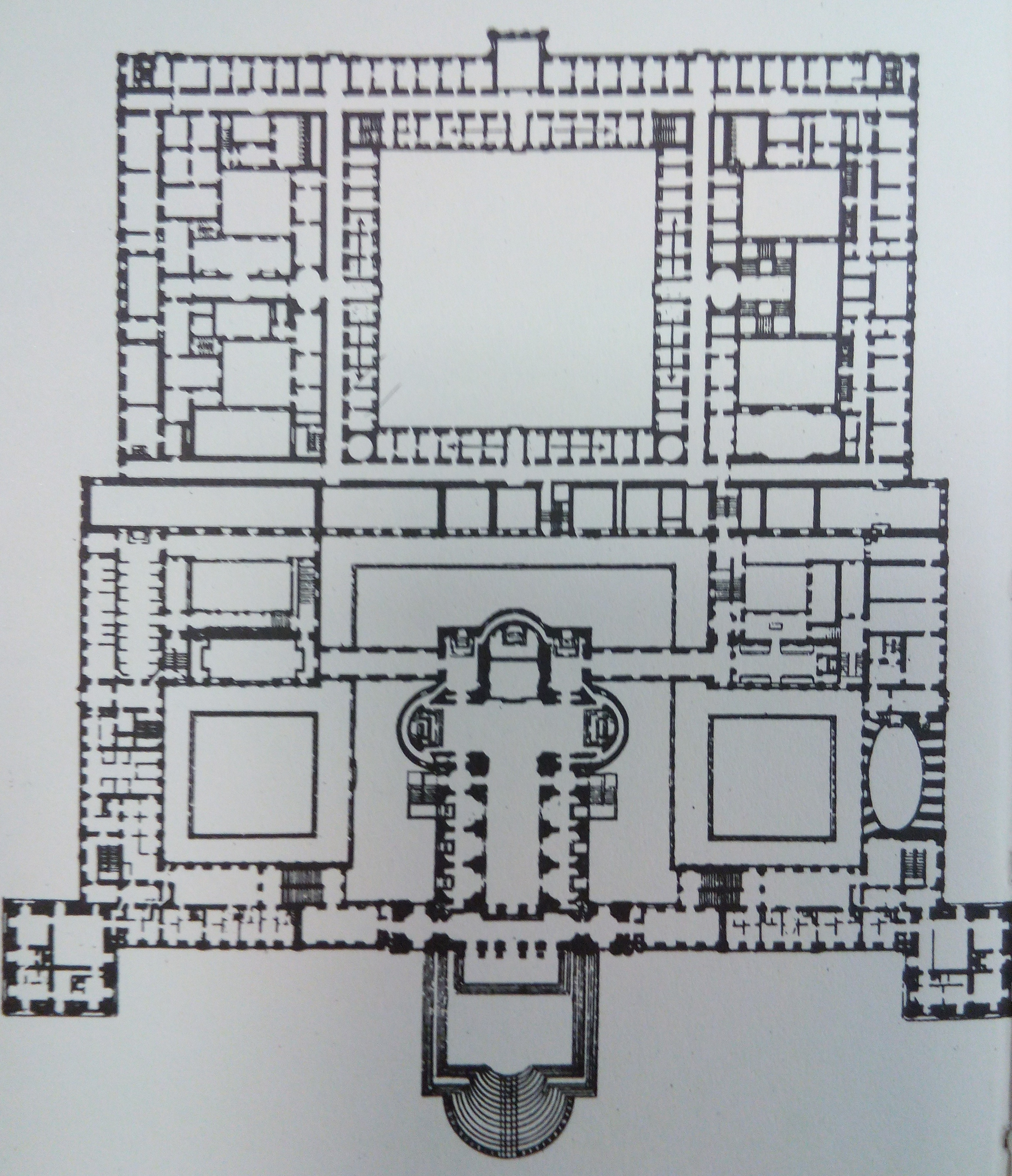
Floorplan of the palatial complex.

Initially it was a relatively small project for a friary of 13 Capuchin friars, who were to observe strict poverty. However, when the flow of gold and diamonds from the Portuguese colony of Brazil started to arrive in Lisbon in abundance, the King changed his plans and announced the construction of a sumptuous palace along with a much enlarged friary. This immense wealth allowed the King to be a generous patron of the arts.

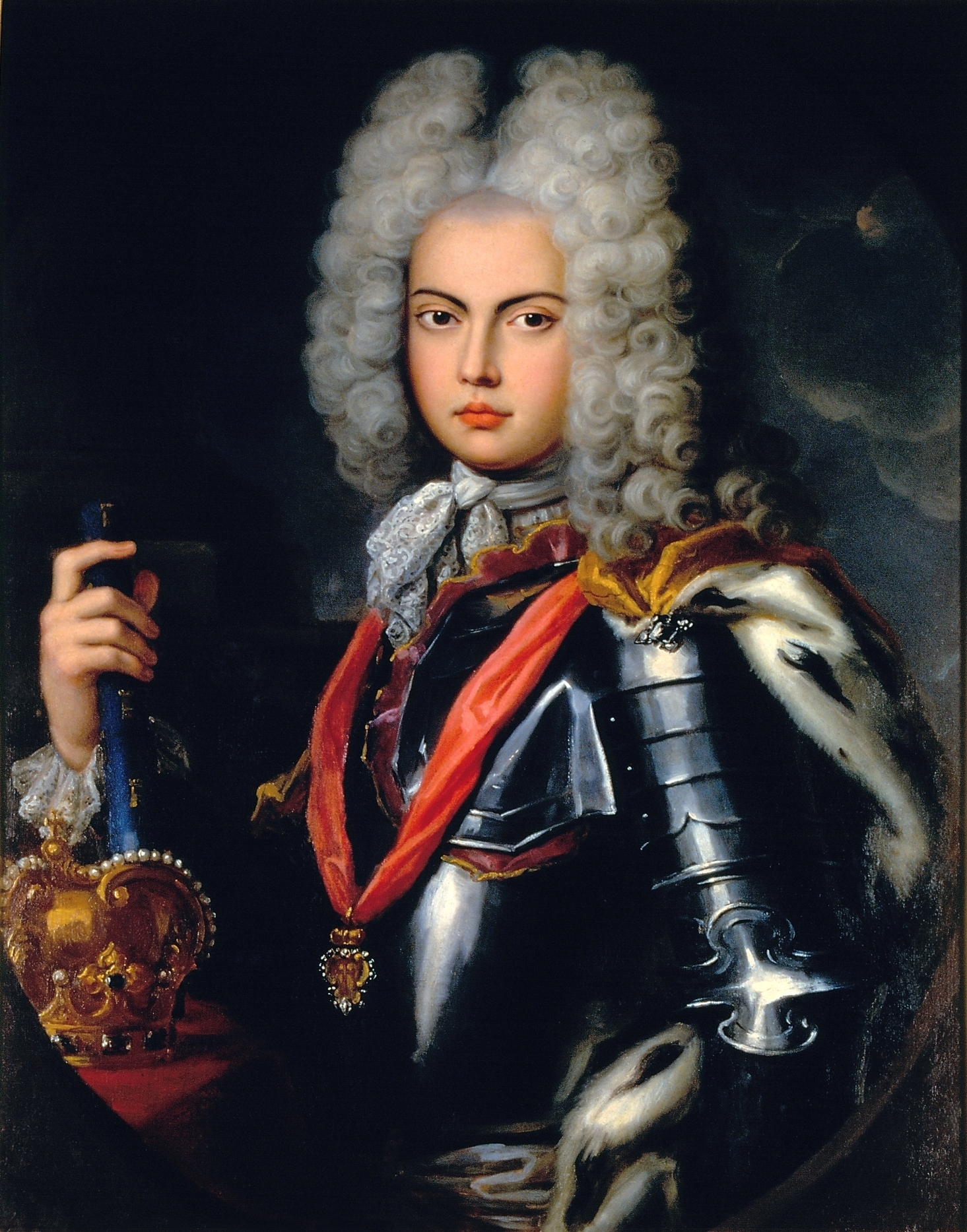
King John V of Portugal, builder of the palace.

He appointed an architect João Frederico Ludovice as director of the royal works at Mafra. Ludwig had studied architecture in Rome and knew contemporary Italian art. The extent of Ludwig's responsibility is unclear, as several other architects were involved in this project: the Milanese builder Carlos Baptista Garbo, Custódio Vieira, Manuel da Maia and even his own son António. However the application of the same architectural style over the whole building suggests the work of Ludwig as the head-architect in charge of the Royal Office of Works (Real Obra).

Construction lasted 13 years and mobilized a vast army of workers from the entire country (a daily average of 15,000 but at the end climbing to 30,000 and a maximum of 45,000), under the command of António Ludovice, the son of the architect. In addition 7,000 soldiers were assigned to preserve order at the construction site. They used 400 kg of gunpowder to blast through the bedrock for the laying of foundations. There was even a hospital for the sick or wounded workers. A total of 1,383 workers died during the construction.

The façade is 220 meters long. The whole complex covers 37,790 m^{2} with about 1,200 rooms, more than 4,700 doors and windows, and 156 stairways.

When complete the building consisted of a friary capable of sheltering 330 friars, along with a royal palace and a huge library of 30,000 books, embellished with marble, exotic woods and countless artworks taken from France, Flanders and Italy, which included six monumental pipe organs and the two carillons.

The basilica and the convent were inaugurated on the day of the King's 41st birthday on October 22, 1730. The festivities lasted for 8 days and were of a scale never seen before in Portugal. The basilica was dedicated to Our Lady and to Saint Anthony of Padua.

However the building was not finished. The lantern on the cupola was completed in 1735. Work continued until 1755, when the work force was needed in Lisbon after the devastation of the Lisbon earthquake.

=== Later history ===
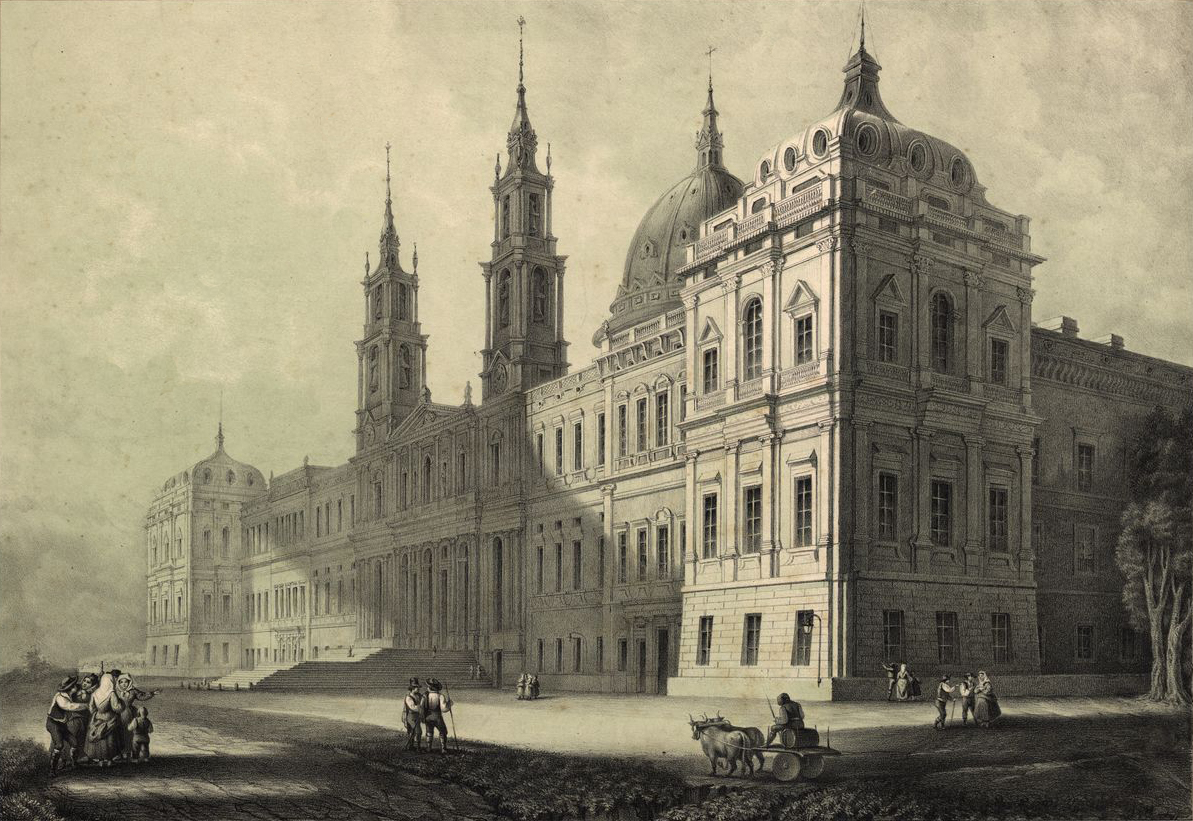
The palace in 1853, during the reign of Queen Maria II of Portugal.

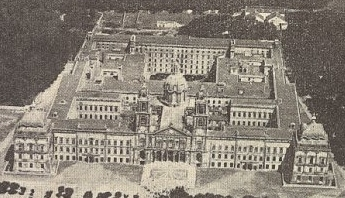
Aerial photograph of the palace taken in 1936.

The palace was not occupied permanently by the royalty, who considered the rooms too gloomy. Nonetheless, it was a popular destination for the members of the royal family who enjoyed hunting in the nearby game preserve, the Tapada Nacional de Mafra. During the regency of Prince John the palace was inhabited for a whole year in 1807. The Prince was responsible for a partial renovation of the building by some well-known artists. However, with the French invasion of Portugal (1807) the royal family fled to Brazil, taking with them some of the best pieces of art and furniture in the building. Jean-Andoche Junot took up residence in the palace, to be driven out in turn by Wellington.

In 1834, after the Liberal Wars, Queen Maria II ordered the dissolution of the religious orders and the convent was abandoned by the Franciscans. During the last reigns of the House of Braganza, the palace was mainly used as a base for hunting. In 1849 the monastery part of the building was assigned to the military, a situation still in use today.

The last king of Portugal, Manuel II, following the proclamation of the republic, left on 5 October 1910 from the palace to the nearby coastal village of Ericeira on his way to exile. The palace was declared a national monument in 1907. At present, the building is conserved by the Direção-Geral do Património Cultural, which carried out several recovery programs, including the conservation of the main façade. A major restoration of the historical pipe organs began in 1998 with the collaboration of foreign experts and was finished in 2010. The restoration won the Europa Nostra 2012 award.

== Description ==
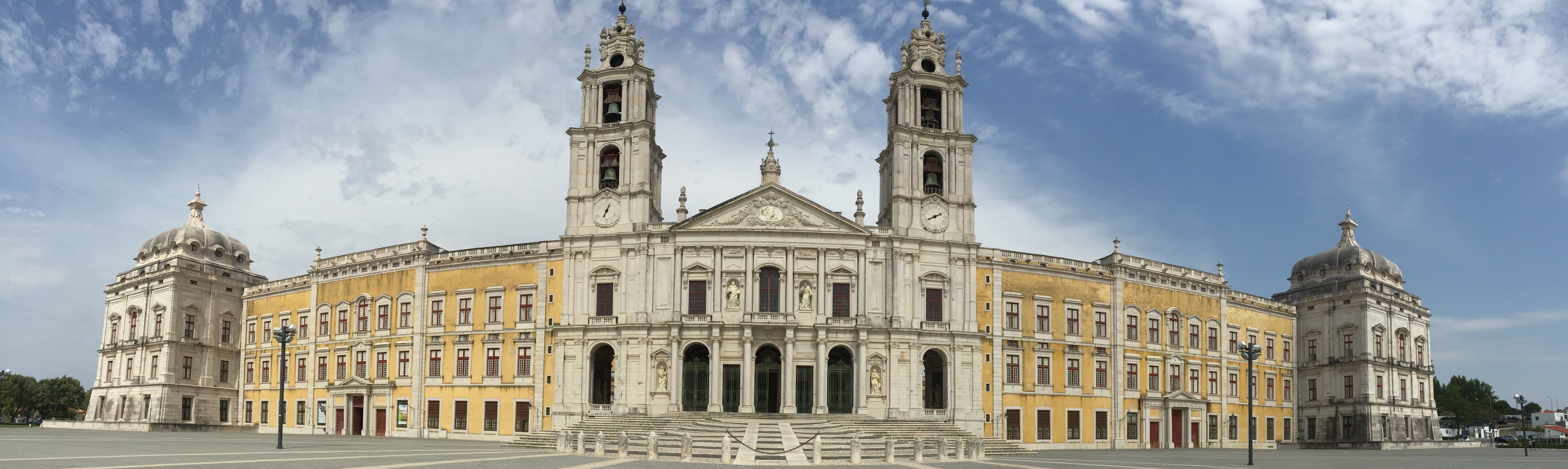
Main façade of the Royal Building of Mafra, designed by architect João Frederico Ludovice.

=== Façade ===
The imposing façade, built of local limestone, is 220 m long and faces the town of Mafra. At each end of the façade stands a square tower with a bulbous dome, such as found in Central Europe. The church, built in white marble, is located in the centre of the main façade, symmetrically flanked on both sides by the royal palace. John V, wishing to rival the splendour of Rome, had sought architectural advice from his ambassador to the Vatican, who sent him small-scale models of important Roman religious buildings. The benedictal balcony at its centre is clearly mirrored on the balcony of St. Peter's Basilica in Rome. But this balcony is rather intended for the King, as a symbol of his power, than for the benedictions by a prelate.

The two church towers (68 m high) are inspired by the towers of Sant'Agnese in Agone (by the Roman Baroque architect Francesco Borromini). Their two carillons contain a total of 92 church bells, founded in Antwerp. The story goes that the Flemish bell-founders were so astonished by the size of their commission, that they asked to be paid in advance. The King retorted by doubling the offered amount. These carillons constitute the largest historical collection in the world.

The two towers are connected by two rows of Corinthian columns. The top row contains the statues of St. Dominic and St. Francis, sculpted from Carrara marble, standing in a niche on each side of the balcony. The lower row contains the statues of St. Clara and St. Elisabeth of Hungary.

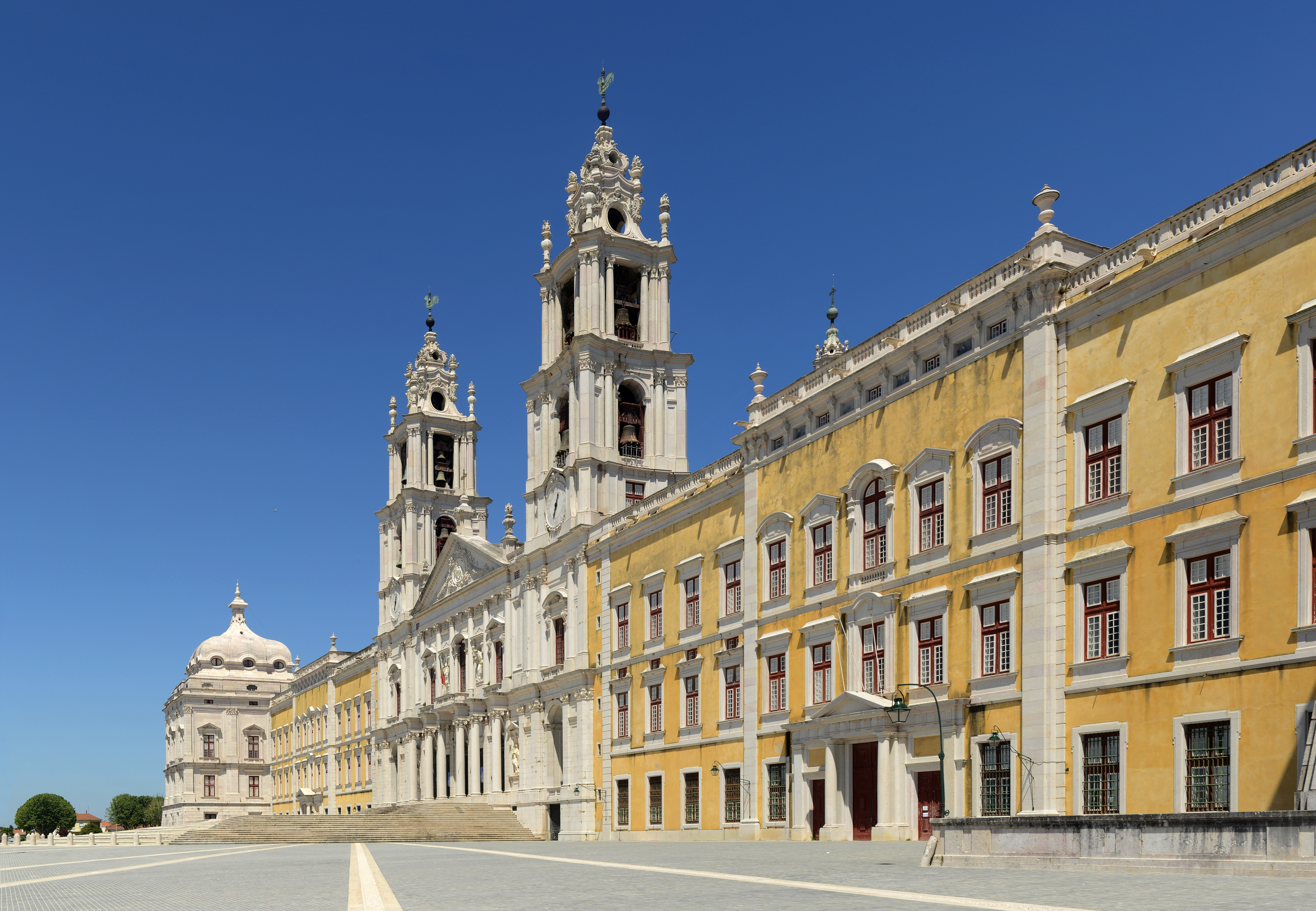
Palace and basilica viewed from the west

Main façade of the palace and basilica

=== Royal Palace ===
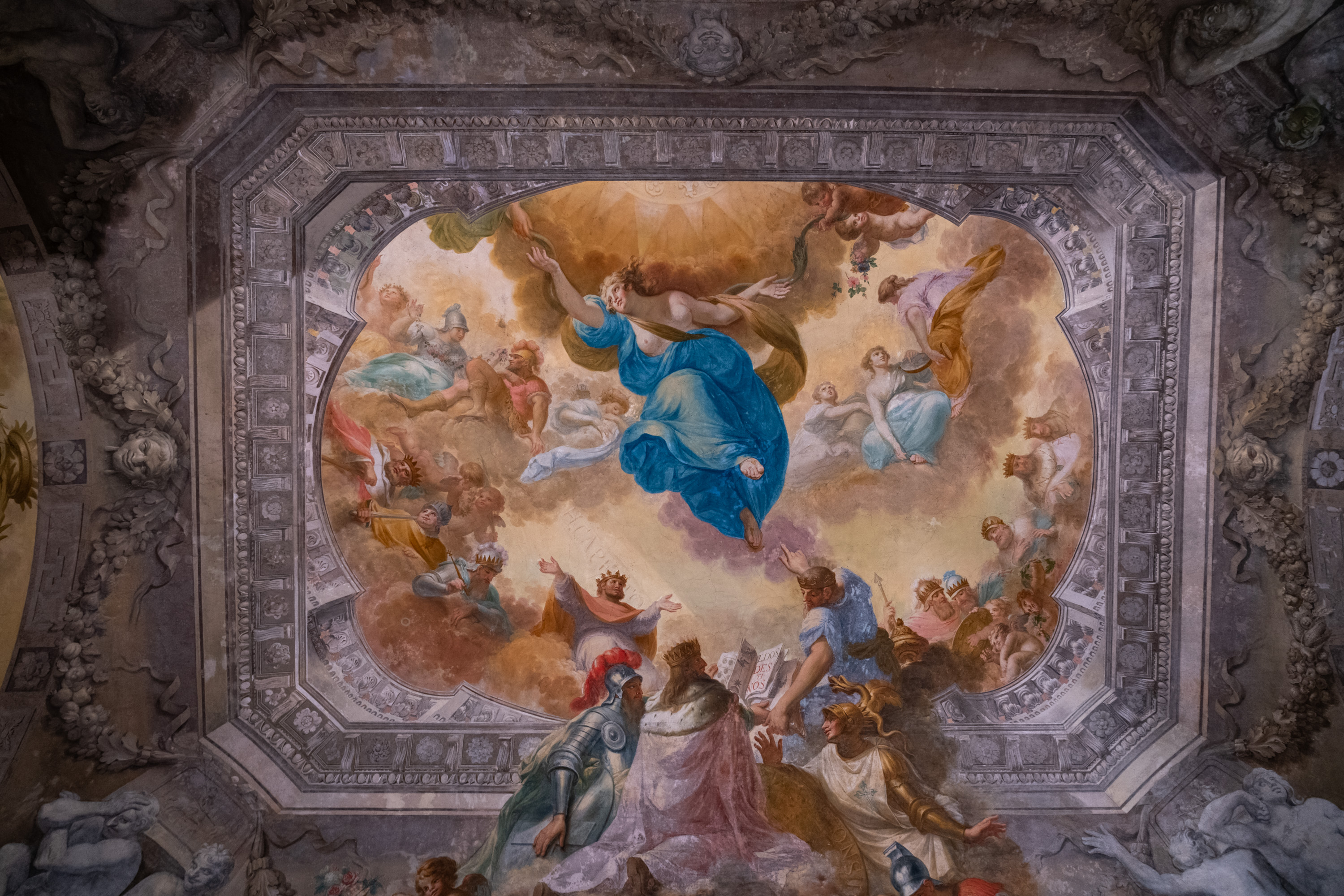

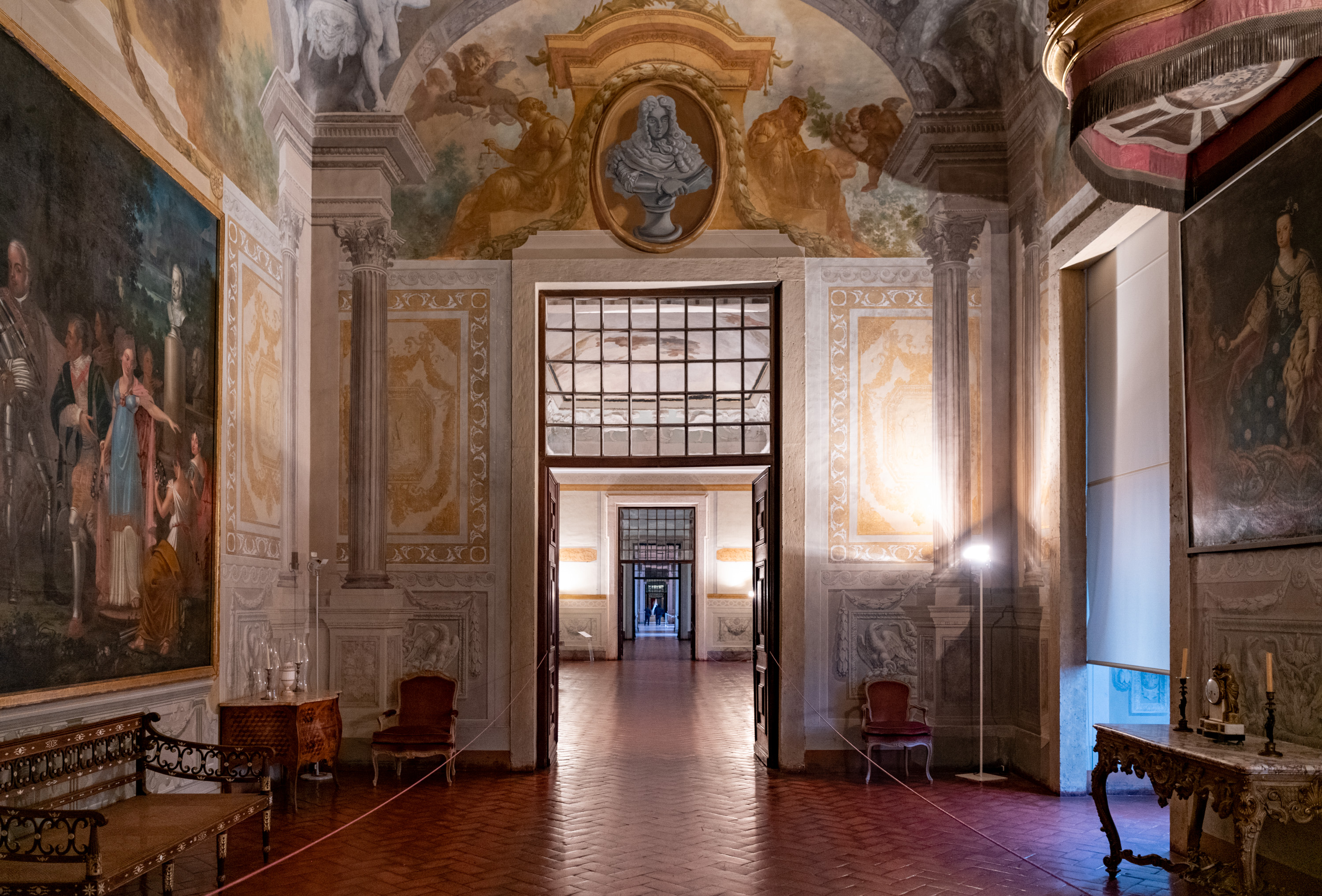

Throne room

King’s bedroom

The spacious royal apartments are situated on the second floor. The apartments of the king are situated at the end of the palace while the apartment of the queen is 200m away at the other end. Such was this distance that, when the king left his apartment towards the apartment of the queen, this was announced to the queen by the sound of a trumpet.

As King John VI had taken with him some of the best pieces of art and furniture in the building when the royal family fled in 1807 from the advancing French troops to Brazil, most rooms had to be redecorated in the original style. The Hunting trophy room (Sala dos Troféus) is decorated with numerous skulls of deer, the furniture is constructed of antlers and covered with deerskin and even the candleholders are made of deer antlers.

The Benediction Gallery (Sala da Benção) borders at the upper level of the basilica. The royal family could here attend Mass, seated at a window opening unto the basilica. The bust of John V in this hall is a work of the Italian Alessandro Giusti. The Throne Room, the Guard Room and the Room of Goddess Diana are decorated with murals by artist such as Cirilo Wolkmar Machado, Bernardo Oliveira Góis and Vieira Lusitano.

=== Basilica ===
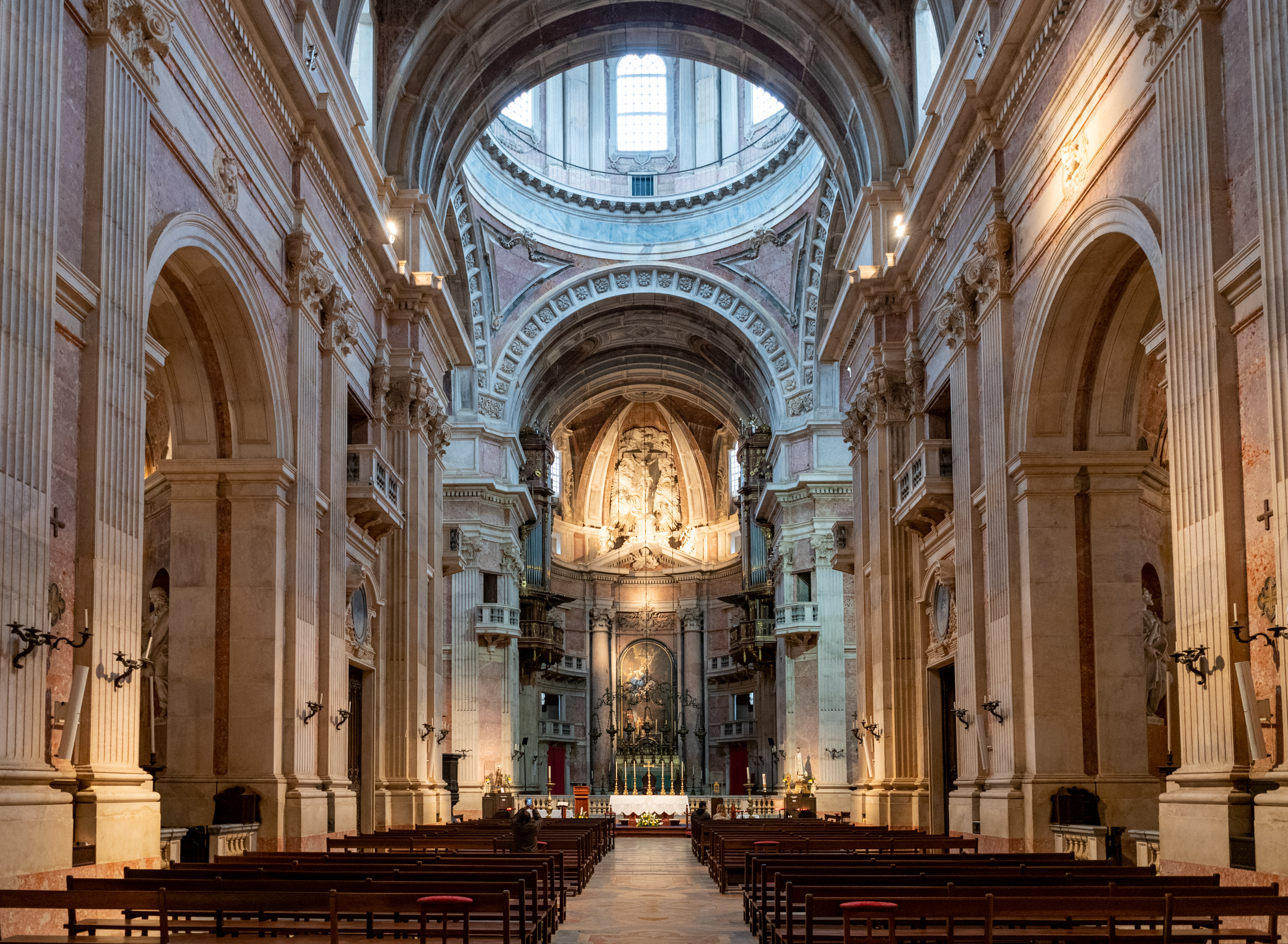
Principal nave of the basilica.

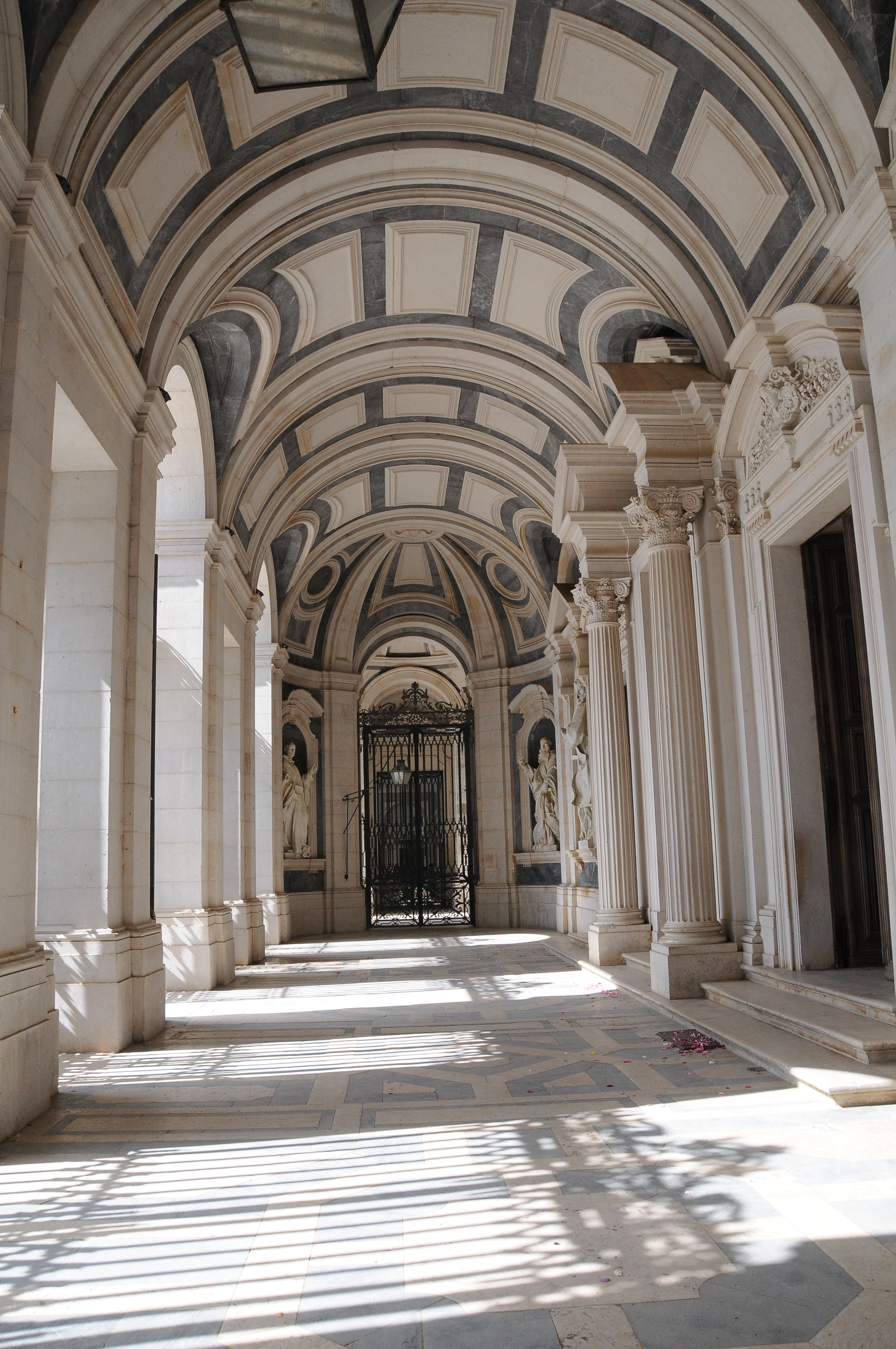
Gallery of the basilica.

The church is built in the form of a Latin cross with a length of 63 m. It is rather narrow (16.5 m), an impression accentuated by the height of its nave (21.5 m). The vestibule (Galilee porch) contains a group of large sculptures in Carrara marble, representing the patron saints of several monastic orders.

The interior makes abundantly use of local rose-coloured marble, intermingled with white marble in different patterns. The multi-coloured designs of the floor are repeated on the ceiling. The barrel vault rests on fluted Corinthian semicolumns standing between the side chapels. The chapels in the transept contain altarpieces in jasper made by sculptors from the School of Mafra. The side aisles display 58 marble statues commissioned from the best Roman sculptors of their time. The All Saint's chapel in the transept is screened from the crossing by iron railings with bronze ornaments, made in Antwerp.

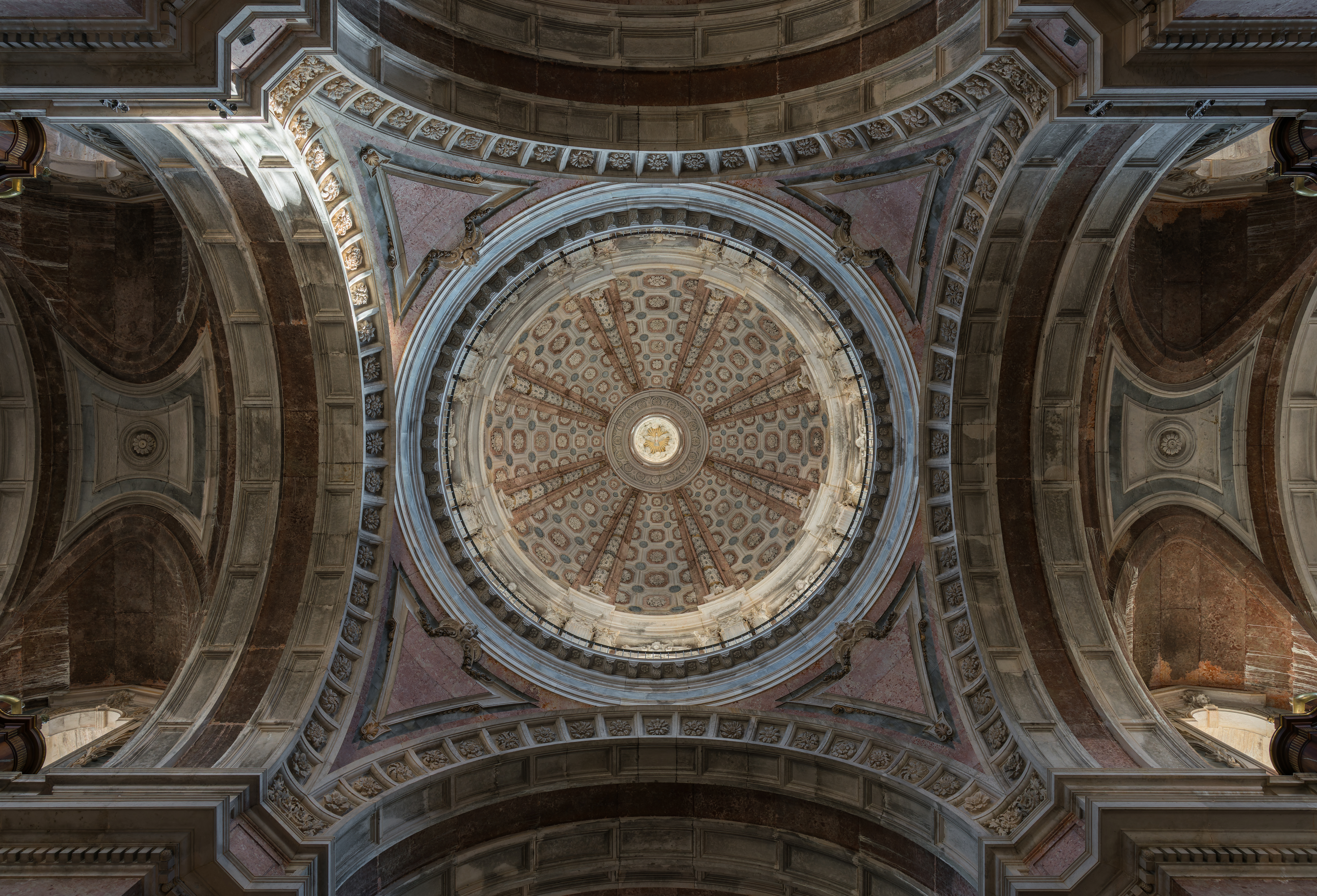
Cupola of the basilica.

The choir has a candleholder with seven lamps sprouting from the mouth of seven rolled-up snakes. Above the main altar, inserting into the ceiling, is a gigantic jasper crucifix of 4.2 m, flanked by two kneeling angels, made by the School of Mafra. The cupola over the crossing was also inspired by the cupola of Sant'Agnese in Agone (by the Roman Baroque architect Francesco Borromini). This 70 m-high cupola with a small lantern atop, is carried by four finely sculpted arcs in rose and white marble.

There are six organs, four of which are located in the transept, constituting a rather uncommon ensemble. These were built by Joaquim Peres Fontanes and António Xavier Machado e Cerveira between 1792 and 1807 (when the French troops occupied Mafra). They were made out of partially gilded Brazilian wood. The largest pipe is 6 m high and has a diameter of 0.28 m. King John V had commissioned liturgical vestments from master embroiderers from Genoa and Milan, such as Giuliano Saturni and Benedetto Salandri, and from France. They attest of superb quality and workmanship by their embroidering in gold technique and the use of silk thread in the same colour.

The religious paintings in the basilica and the convent constitute one of the most significant 18th century collections in Portugal. They include works by the Italians Agostino Masucci, Corrado Giaquinto, Francesco Trevisani, Pompeo Batoni and some Portuguese students in Rome such as Vieira Lusitano and Inácio de Oliveira Bernardes. The sculpture collection contains works by almost every major Roman sculptor from the first half of the 18th century. At that time, it represented the biggest single order done by a foreign power in Rome and still is one of the biggest collections in existence.

The parish of Mafra (Santo André de Mafra) and the Royal and Venerable Confraternity of the Most Blessed Sacrament of Mafra (Portuguese: Real e Venerável Irmandade do Santíssimo Sacramento de Mafra) have their headquarters in the basilica.

On 10 November 2020, Pope Francis granted a canonical coronation to the image of Our Lady of Solitude of the basilica, guarded by the Confraternity of the Most Blessed Sacrament.

=== Library ===
Library

Detail of the Rococo bookshelves.

Detailed view of the Rococo balcony and bookcases

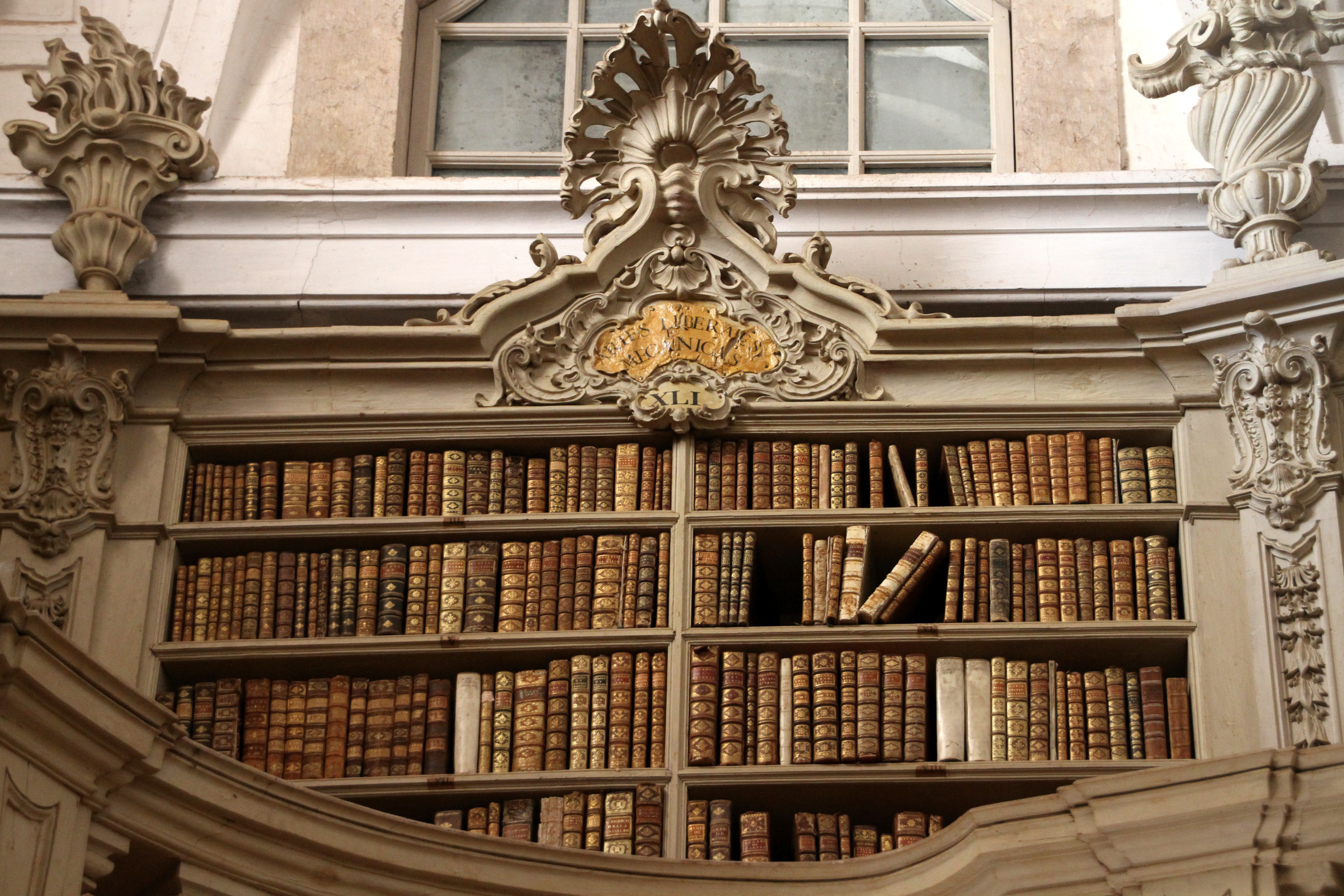
The palace library contains over 36,000 historic and priceless volumes.

The Rococo library, situated at the back of the second floor, is the highlight of the palace, rivalling the grandeur of the library of the Melk Abbey in Austria. Built by Manuel Caetano de Sousa, this library is 88 m long, 9.5 m wide and 13 m high. The magnificent floor is covered with tiles of rose, grey and white marble. The wooden bookshelves in Rococo style are situated on the sidewalls in two rows, separated by a balcony with a wooden railing. They contain over 36,000 leather-bound volumes, attesting of the extent of western knowledge from the 14th to the 19th century. Among them, are many valuable bibliographical jewels, such as incunabula. These finished volumes were bound in the local workshop (Livraria) in the rocaille style (also by Manuel Caetano de Sousa).

The library is known for homing bats which protect the books from insect damage. The library's bat colony includes grey long-eared bats and serotine bats.

The library was used in Gulliver's Travels (1996) as the Great Chamber of War for the Emperor of Lilliput.

=== Convent ===
The rectangle behind the church and the palace houses the friary of the Franciscan friars of Arrábida Order (Ordem de São Francisco da Província da Arrábida) with cells for about 300 friars in long corridors on several floors. Between 1771 and 1791 this monastery was occupied by the Hermit Friars of St. Augustine.

North cloister. In the background, the basilica dome

Convent infirmary with curtained bed bays and a chapel at the far end

=== Mafra School of Sculpture ===
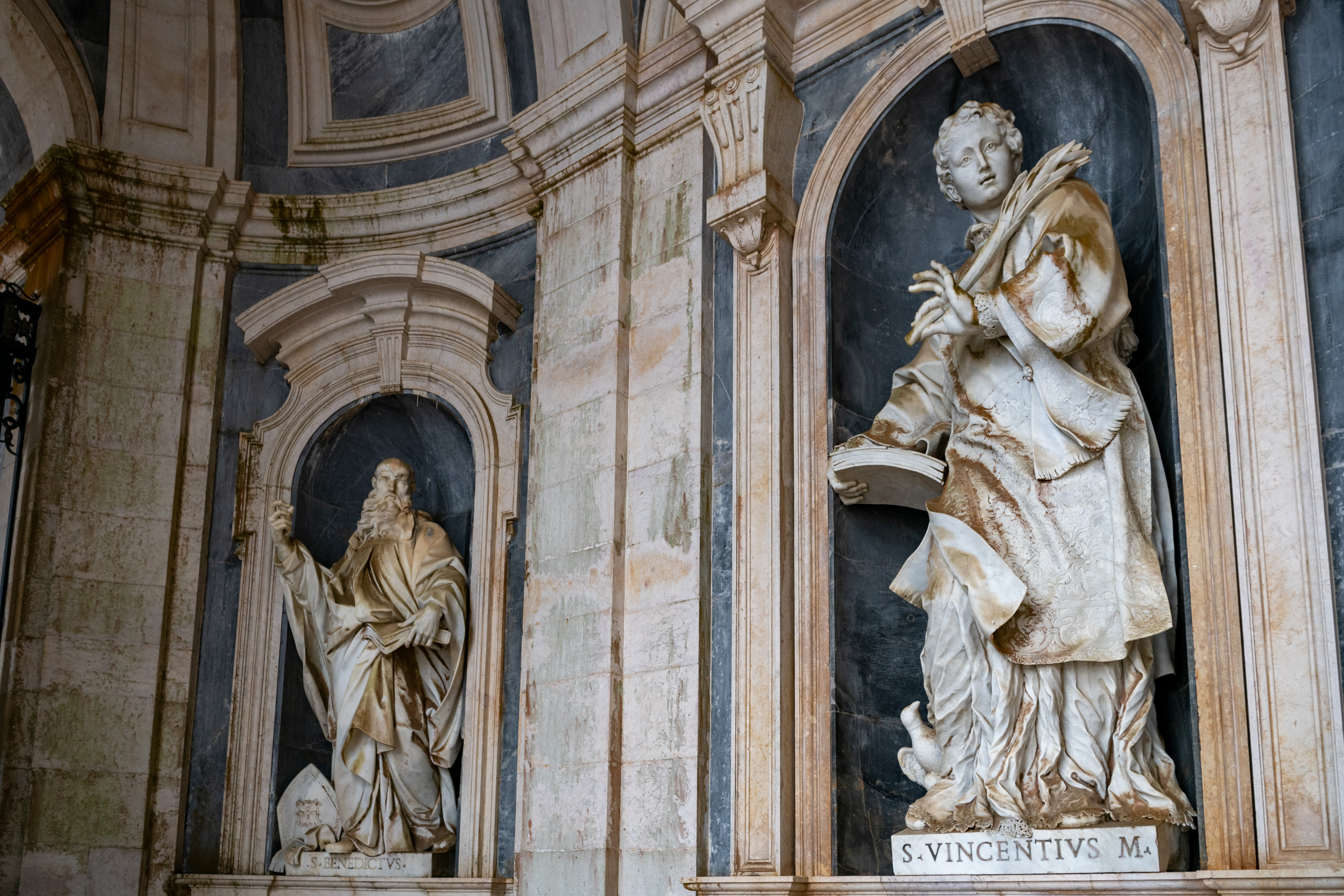
Sculptures by the School of Mafra.

The Mafra School of Sculpture was founded during the reign of King Joseph I of Portugal, successor of King John V. As the Mafra National Palace had a great need for sculptors, local and from abroad, it became the location of a sculpture academy headed by the Italian Alessandro Giusti (1715–1799).

Among the teachers were several important sculptors, such as José de Almeida (1709–1769), Claude de Laprade (1682–1738) and Giovanni Antonio da Padova (who created most of the statues for the cathedral of Évora).

The academy was awarded many commissions by the Augustinians from the monastery, resulting in the many marble statues and retables in marble and jasper in the basilica. This academy produced several generations of Portuguese sculptors, such as Joaquim Machado de Castro (1731–1822).

=== Jardim do Cerco ===
Jardim do Cerco

== Cultural influence ==
A major reference to the construction of the palace is made in the novel Baltasar and Blimunda (Memorial do Convento), written by the Portuguese Nobel laureate José Saramago. The main character, Baltasar, born in Mafra, works on the construction of the palace. Saramago makes a detailed description of the building process, including the transport of a giant stone from the quarry to the building site (which Baltasar assists with), depicting it as a torture for those who helped build the palace.

== See also ==
- Other Portuguese royal residences:
  - Sintra National Palace
  - Ajuda National Palace
  - Belém Palace
  - Palace of Necessidades
  - Pena National Palace
  - Queluz National Palace
  - List of Baroque residences
- Royal and Venerable Confraternity of the Most Blessed Sacrament of Mafra
- List of carillons
- 18th-century Western domes
