= Alexandre Leitão =

Portuguese footballer

Personal information
- Full name: Alexandre Filipe Clemente Leitão
- Date of birth: 28 March 1979 (age 47)
- Place of birth: Mafra, Portugal
- Position: Midfielder

Team information
- Current team: G.D. Estoril-Praia

Senior career*
Years	Team	Apps	(Gls)
1997–04	Torreense		
2004–05	Olhanense		
2005–06	Paços de Ferreira		
2006–07	Olhanense		
2007–09	G.D. Estoril-Praia		
- * Club domestic league appearances and goals as of 30 May 2009

Alexandre Filipe Clemente Leitão (born 28 March 1979) is a Portuguese footballer who plays as a midfielder for G.D. Estoril-Praia.
