= Tapada Nacional de Mafra =

Park in Mafra, Portugal

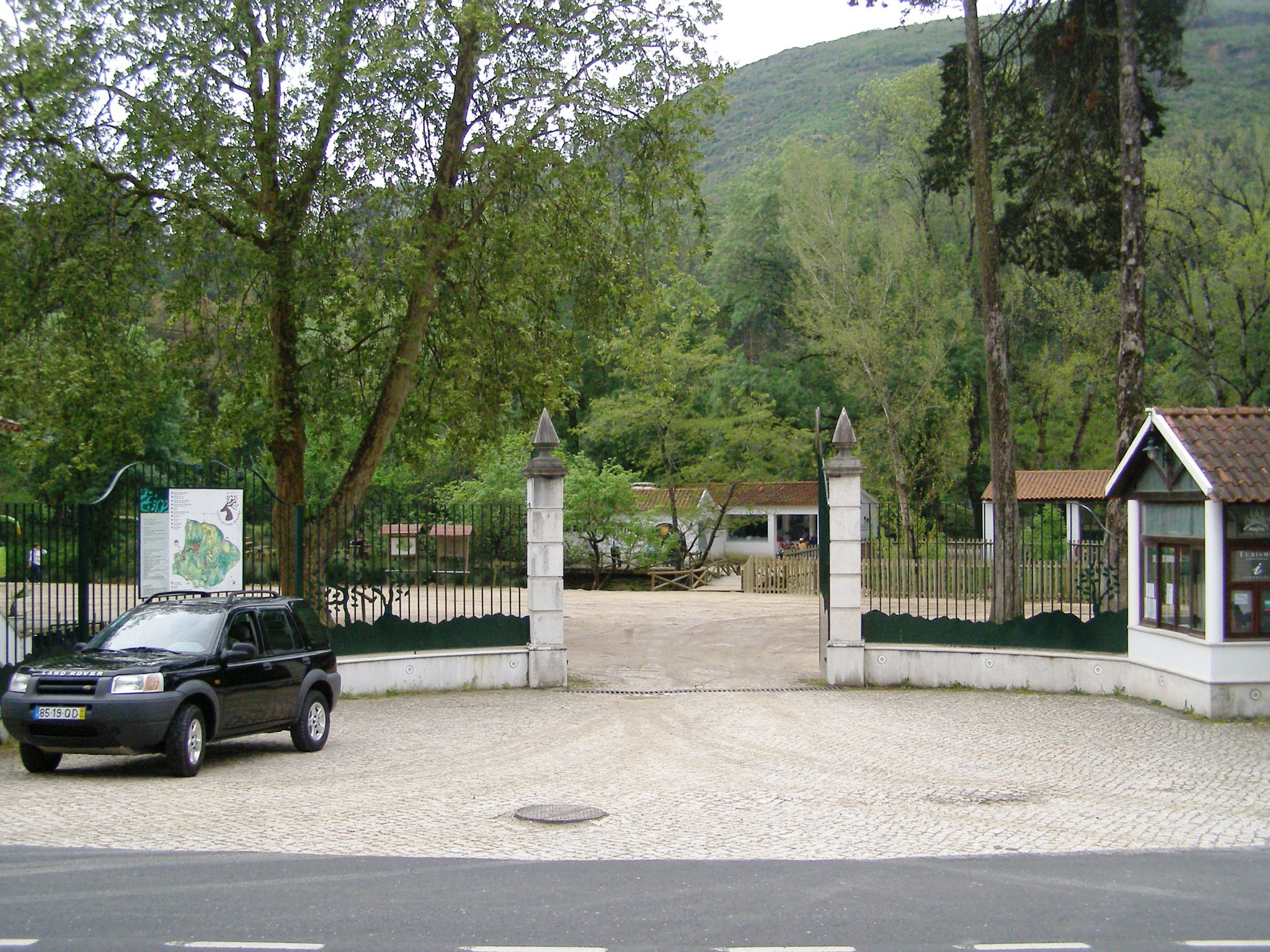
- Porta do Codeçal, the main entrance
- Interactive map of Tapada Nacional de Mafra
- Location: Mafra, Portugal
- Coordinates: 38°57′10″N 9°17′48″W

UNESCO World Heritage Site
- Part of: Royal Building of Mafra – Palace, Basilica, Convent, Cerco Garden and Hunting Park (Tapada)
- Criteria: Cultural: (iv)
- Reference: 1573
- Inscription: 2019 (43rd Session)
- Area: 1,213.17 ha (2,997.8 acres)
- Buffer zone: 693.239 ha (1,713.03 acres)

The Tapada Nacional de Mafra was created in Mafra, Portugal, during the reign of king João V, following the building of the Mafra National Palace, as a park for royal and court recreation.

Covering over 8 square kilometres, the park holds different species of deer, wild boar, foxes, birds of prey and many others coexisting in an unusually rich and diversified natural habitat. A favourite of the Portuguese monarchy for hunting and other leisure pursuits, the Tapada de Mafra took on a noble connotation that has done much to aid its preservation and continuity.

Its natural heritage ensures it is an excellent location for fun environmental awareness and education programmes. The Tapada is also open for walking, mountain biking, horse riding, archery and crossbow shooting activities.

On 7 July 2019, the Royal Building of Mafra – Palace, Basilica, Convent, Cerco Garden and Hunting Park (Tapada) was inscribed as a UNESCO World Heritage Site. With an area of 1187 hectares, surrounded by a 21 km long wall, the Tapada de Mafra has a great diversity of animal and plant species and is an area with regulated (paid) access. The area has been divided into three since 1828, with the first 360 hectares under military administration.
