= Santo Isidoro, Mafra =

Santo Isidoro
- Civil parish
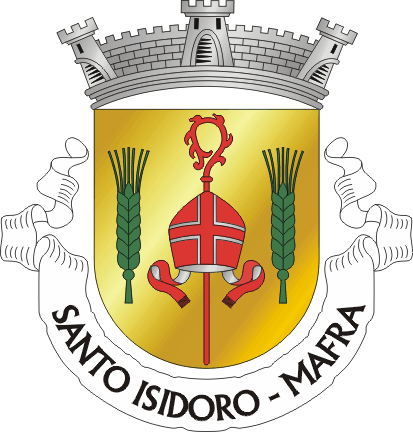
- Coat of arms

- Location in Portugal
- Coordinates: 38.993611°N 9.398611°W
- Country: Portugal
- Region: Lisbon
- District: Lisbon
- Municipality: Mafra

Area
  - Total: 24.83 km^{2} (9.59 sq mi)

Population (2011)
  - Total: 3,814
  - Density: 150/km^{2} (400/sq mi)
- Time zone: UTC+00:00 (WET)
  - Summer (DST): UTC+01:00 (WEST)
- Postal code: 2640
- Patron: Isidore

Santo Isidoro is a civil parish in the municipality of Mafra, Portugal. The population in 2011 was 3,814 in an area of 24.83 km².

== Population ==
Santo Isidoro Parish Population
1864	1878	1890	1900	1911	1920	1930	1940	1950	1960	1970	1981	1991	2001	2011
1 470	1 594	1 774	1 747	2 070	1 954	2 113	2 503	2 515	2 515	2 438	2 499	2 688	2 992	3 814

== Villages ==
- Ribamar
- Picanceira
- Monte Bom
- Monte Godel
- Pucariça
- Lagoa
- Pedra Amassada
- Safarujo
- Penegache
- Junqueiros
- Bracial
- Casais de Monte Bom
- Palhais
