= João Frederico Ludovice =

German architect and goldsmith

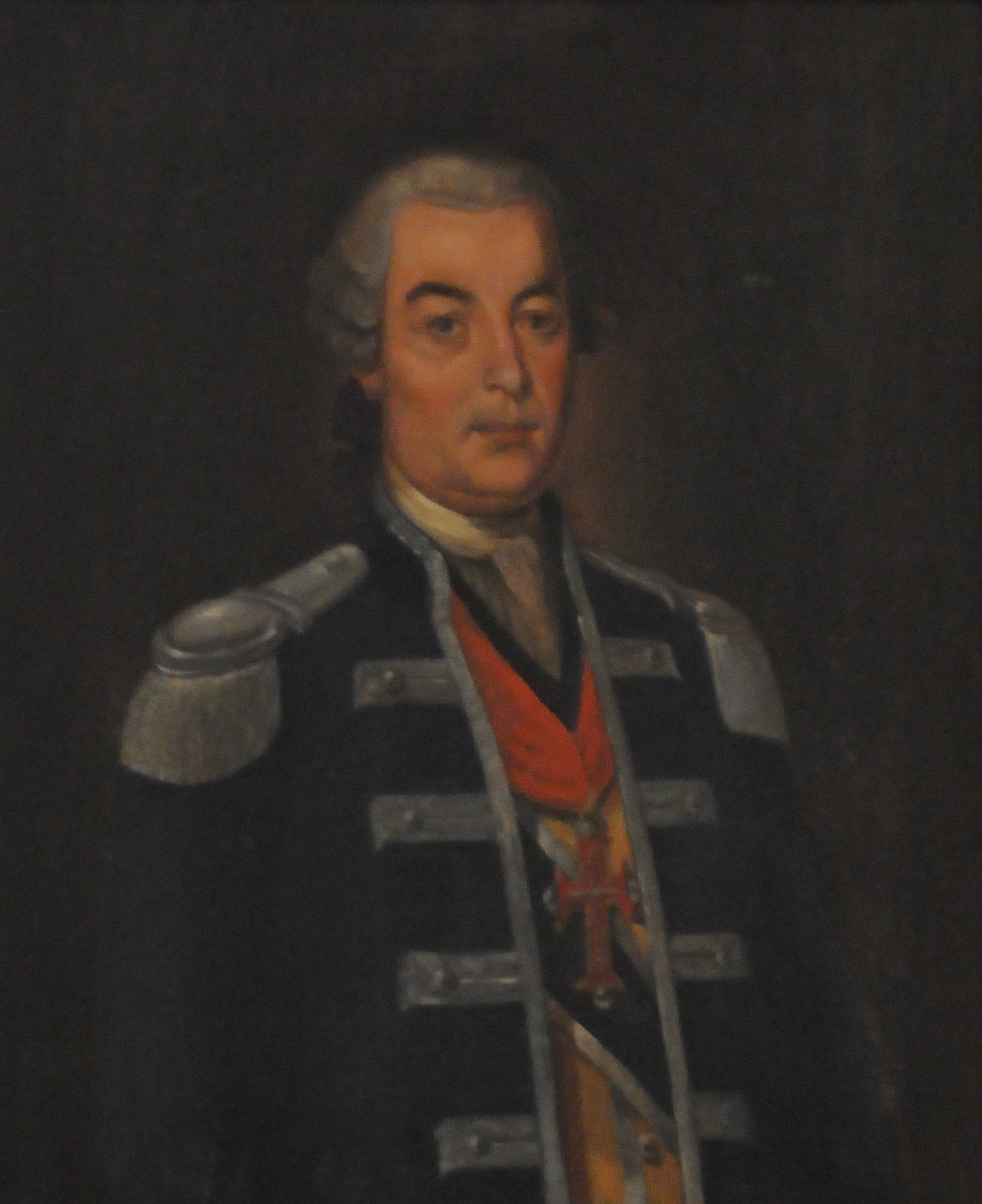
João Frederico Ludovice.

João Frederico Ludovice (German: Johann Friedrich Ludwig) (1670 in Baden-Wurttemberg – 18 January 1752 in Lisbon) was a German-born Portuguese architect and goldsmith.

== Early life ==
The younger son of Peter Ludwig, a notary, and his wife Elisabetha Rosina von Engelhardt, Johann was born near Schwäbisch Hall in 1670. His family belonged to the lower Protestant nobility of Swabia. Like all his siblings, Johann attended the Hall grammar school. His father introduced him to goldsmithing.

At the age of 19, Johann went to Augsburg and enlisted in the military, taking part in the Nine Years' War (also known as the Palatinate War), which had broken out in 1688 against France. During his eight year service, Johann probably served as a military engineer, acquiring formal knowledge in engineering and architecture.

== Move to Italy ==
Upon leaving the army in 1697, he went to Italy in the company of the goldsmith Johann Adolf Gaap and settled in Rome, where he developed his artistic skills, particularly in sculpture and architecture, and changed his surname to Ludovice. His extensive knowledge in various fields earned him the favor of the Society of Jesus, who sought to utilize his rare talents and attempted to recruit him into the Society of Jesus. In 1700, Ludovice renounced his Lutheran faith and married Clara Agnese, a Catholic.

== Work in Portugal ==
While serving the Society of Jesus, he worked at the Church of the Gesù (Rome), casting and engraving the statue of Saint Ignatius of Loyola (created by Groos) and various liturgical objects. His work was highly praised, gradually setting him apart from other Italian and French artisans. At the end of 1700, Ludovici arrived with his wife in Lisbon, settling on Rua dos Canos near the Jesuit College of Santo Antão, signing an exclusive contract for seven years with the Jesuits, committing to create a new Tabernacle and several other liturgical objects. On January 1, 1701, his first son, João Pedro Ludovice, was born in Lisbon to Kiara Agnese, who died in childbirth. On September 13 of the same year, a sentence was pronounced against Ludovici for failing to meet the exclusivity agreement with the Jesuits. King Dom Pedro II intervened on his behalf, paying the legal costs and convincing the Jesuits to allow Ludovici to work occasionally for some royal patronage Churches or even the Portuguese Royal Court.

== Artistic contributions ==
Thus, by 1701, Ludovici was already working for the Portuguese Court. For 16 years, he dedicated himself almost exclusively to Goldsmithing, though most of his works are unidentified, as Ludovici often only designed the pieces, which were then signed by the executing goldsmiths. Nevertheless, he is credited with the Silver Tabernacle of the Church of Santo Antão, the Silver Altar and Bench of the Carmo Convent, the set of Pedestals of the Sé de Coimbra, and various objects for the Royal Chapel of Paço da Ribeira, the Church of São Vicente de Fora, and the Basilica of Mafra, as well as the Monstrance of the Sé de Lisboa.

== Major projects ==
The young king Dom João V commissioned Ludovici to restructure the old Paço da Ribeira and its former Manueline Chapel, transforming it into the Patriarchal Church of Lisbon. These works were highly praised, and the chapel of the Paço da Ribeira was described as one of the most magnificent and sumptuous in Europe. However, Ludovici's fate was radically altered by King Dom João V's decree, dated September 26, 1711, promising the construction of a Palace in Mafra. This led to a kind of public competition, with the king ordering the creation of several designs for the project. Among the competitors were famous Italian architects Filippo Juvarra and António Canevari, who worked on other projects for the Portuguese Court; however, the monarch chose Ludovici's design.

The Mafra Palace-Convent began construction on November 17, 1717, with the laying of the first stone in a grand ceremony. Ludovici oversaw the project, and in 1730, his son João Pedro Ludovice, also an architect, replaced him. The grandeur of the Mafra project required the involvement of many skilled professionals, and Ludovici’s training led to the creation of the Mafra School of Draftsmanship, where several architects were trained, later distinguishing themselves during the reign of José I. In parallel, Ludovici worked on other projects, including the restructuring of the Paço da Ribeira and its Royal Chapel (known as the Patriarchal), the High Altar of Évora Cathedral, the High Altar of São Vicente de Fora, and the High Altar of the Church of São Domingos (Lisbon). Unfortunately, most of his works were destroyed in the 1755 Lisbon earthquake, including the Paço and the Patriarchal, with only one portal surviving, now part of the facade of the Church of São Domingos in Lisbon.

== Personal life ==
In 1700, Ludovice converted to Catholicism and married Chiara Agnese Morelli in Naples, in the Kingdom of Naples, daughter of industrialist Francesco Morelli and his wife Anna Morelli. Ludovici built the Quinta de Alfarrobeira estate in Benfica, completed in 1727, and in its chapel, he married D. Anna Maria Verney (sister of Luís António Verney) in 1720. From this marriage, seven children were born. In Lisbon, at the top of Calçada da Glória, he built a five-story palace with balcony windows, considered one of the most beautiful in old Lisbon, completed in 1747. Ludovici was also involved in the construction of the Águas Livres Aqueduct, although he opposed the solutions proposed for the Alcântara Valley crossing.

== Honors and recognition ==
Dom João V granted him several honors, including his appointment in 1720 as the Architect of the Works of São Vicente de Fora and the Order of Christ in 1740. By 1718, during the works at Évora Cathedral, Dom João V referred to him as REGIUS ARCHITECTUS - IOANNES FEDERICUS LUDOVISIUS. However, his supreme recognition came in 1750, during the reign of Dom José I, when he was officially named Master Architect of the Kingdom, with the rank, salary, and status of Infantry Brigadier. The decree mentioned his 43 years of service to Dom João V, noting that his designs and models, once executed, reflected the magnificence of the monarch who commissioned them, and that his instruction of the workers had significantly advanced the arts in the kingdom. The decree also referenced services rendered both within the kingdom and abroad, implying that his work extended to Colonial Brazil.

== Death ==
As historian Vilhena de Barbosa later emphatically wrote (in "Estudos Históricos e Arqueológicos - Volume II"): "[...] this appointment of the octogenarian artist was not a reward for his services. It had a nobler and higher meaning: it was the disinterested reward given for merit; it was the laurel crown with which a grateful people's crowned representative adorned the illustrious artist at the end of his worldly life. It was, in the end, the light of glory projecting brilliance over an as yet empty grave, while also illuminating the path for new disciples toward the Temple of the Arts."

Covered in prestige and surrounded by great respect, **João Frederico Ludovice** died in Lisbon on January 18, 1752, on Rua Larga de São Roque—where he was then residing—and was buried in the Church of São Roque, as recorded in his death certificate.
