= Secil Prize =

Portuguese architecture and engineering award

- Description: Recognition of outstanding contributions to architecture and civil engineering
- Country: Portugal
- Presented by: Secil
- First award: 1992
- Website: www.secil-group.com/pt/a-secil/premios-secil

The Secil Prize (Portuguese: Prémio Secil) is a national award in Portugal that recognizes outstanding achievements in the fields of architecture and civil engineering. Established in 1992 by the Portuguese cement company Secil, it is widely considered the highest and most prestigious distinction within the Portuguese architectural community.

== Structure and Categories ==
The award is promoted in collaboration with the official professional public associations of Portugal: the Ordem dos Arquitectos (Order of Architects) and the Ordem dos Engenheiros (Order of Engineers). It is divided into two main regular categories:

- Secil Architecture Prize (Prémio Secil de Arquitectura): Awarded to a completed architectural work that significantly contributes to the enrichment of Portuguese built heritage.
- Secil Civil Engineering Prize (Prémio Secil de Engenharia Civil): Recognizes engineering projects demonstrating high technical complexity, innovation, and quality.

A separate category established to distinguish outstanding final thesis projects by students in both architecture and civil engineering faculties across the country.

== Notable Architecture Laureates ==
The architecture prize has been awarded to several prominent Portuguese architects, including recipients of the Pritzker Architecture Prize. Notable winners include:

- Álvaro Siza Vieira (1996, for the Castro & Melo building; 2000, for the Faculty of Communication Sciences in Santiago de Compostela; and 2006, for the Cornellà desportive complex)
- Eduardo Souto de Moura (1992, for the Casa das Artes in Porto; 2004, for the Estádio Municipal de Braga; and 2010, for the Casa das Histórias Paula Rego)
- João Luís Carrilho da Graça (1994, for the Escola Superior de Comunicação Social; and 2024, for the Portas do Mar project in Lisbon)

== Complete List of Architecture Winners ==
Below is the chronological list of winners of the national Secil Architecture Prize since its inception:

Year	Architect(s)	Winning Work	Location
1992	Eduardo Souto de Moura	Casa das Artes	Porto
1994	João Luís Carrilho da Graça	Escola Superior de Comunicação Social	Lisbon
1996	Álvaro Siza Vieira	Edifício Castro & Melo	Lisbon
1998	Vítor Figueiredo	Escola Superior de Arte e Design	Caldas da Rainha
2000	Álvaro Siza Vieira	Faculty of Communication Sciences (Santiago de Compostela)	Spain
2002	Pedro Maurício Borges	Casa Pacheco de Melo	Azores
2004	Eduardo Souto de Moura	Estádio Municipal de Braga	Braga
2006	Álvaro Siza Vieira	Cornellà de Llobregat Sports Complex	Barcelona, Spain
2008	Nuno Brandão Costa	Móveis Viriato Administrative Building and Showroom	Paredes
2010	Eduardo Souto de Moura	Casa das Histórias Paula Rego	Cascais
2012	José Neves	Requalification and Extension of the Francisco de Arruda School	Lisbon
2020	Aires Mateus (Manuel and Francisco Aires Mateus)	EDP Corporate Headquarters	Lisbon
2020	Francisco Vieira de Campos, Cristina Guedes and João Mendes Ribeiro	Arquipélago – Contemporary Arts Centre	Azores
2024	João Luís Carrilho da Graça	Portas do Mar	Lisbon
2024	Miguel Marcelino	Casa do Quintal	Torres Novas
