= Parque das Nações =

- Civil parish
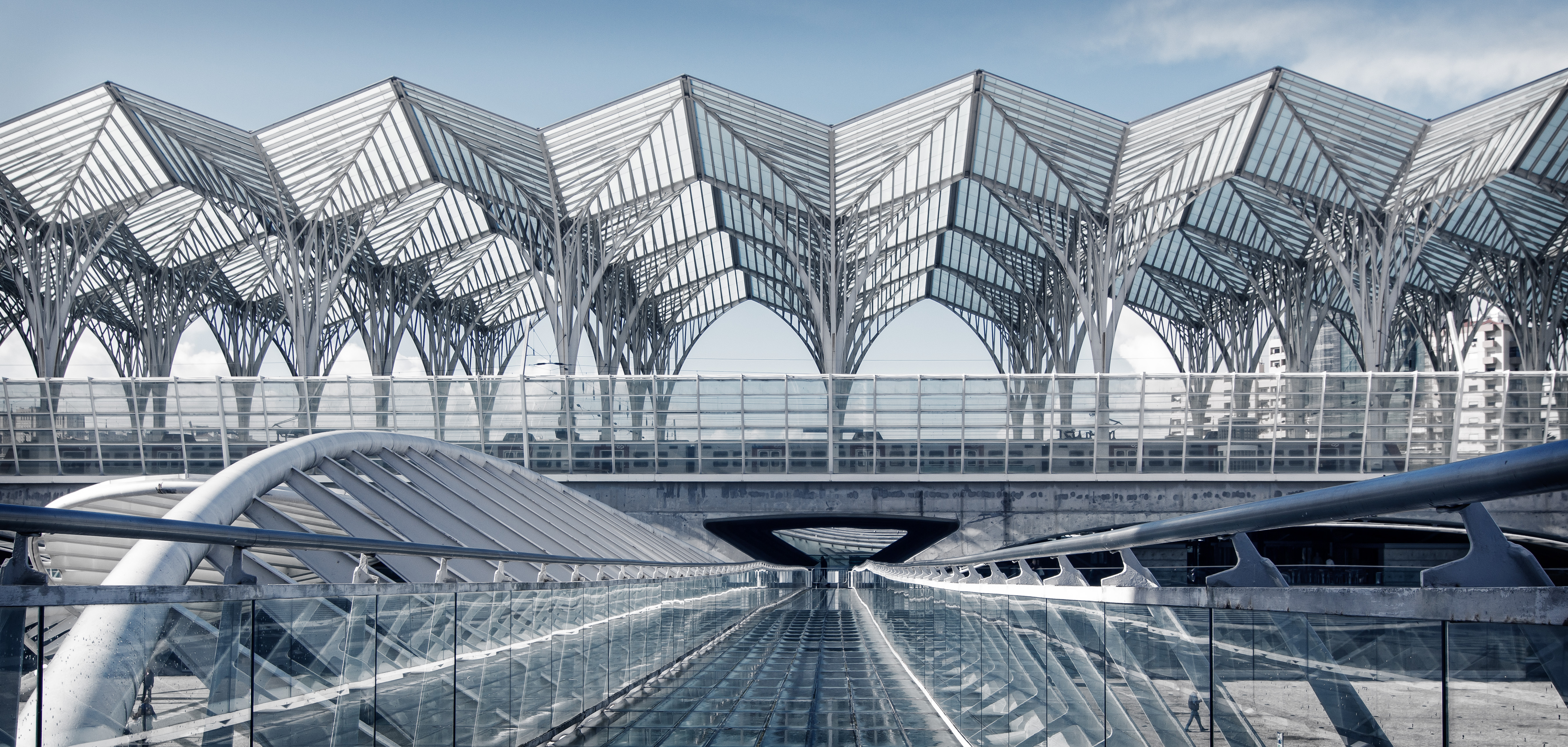
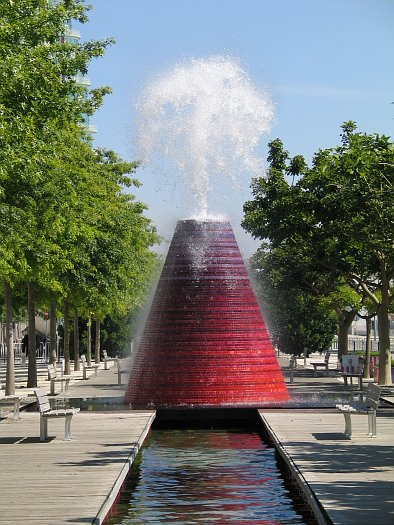
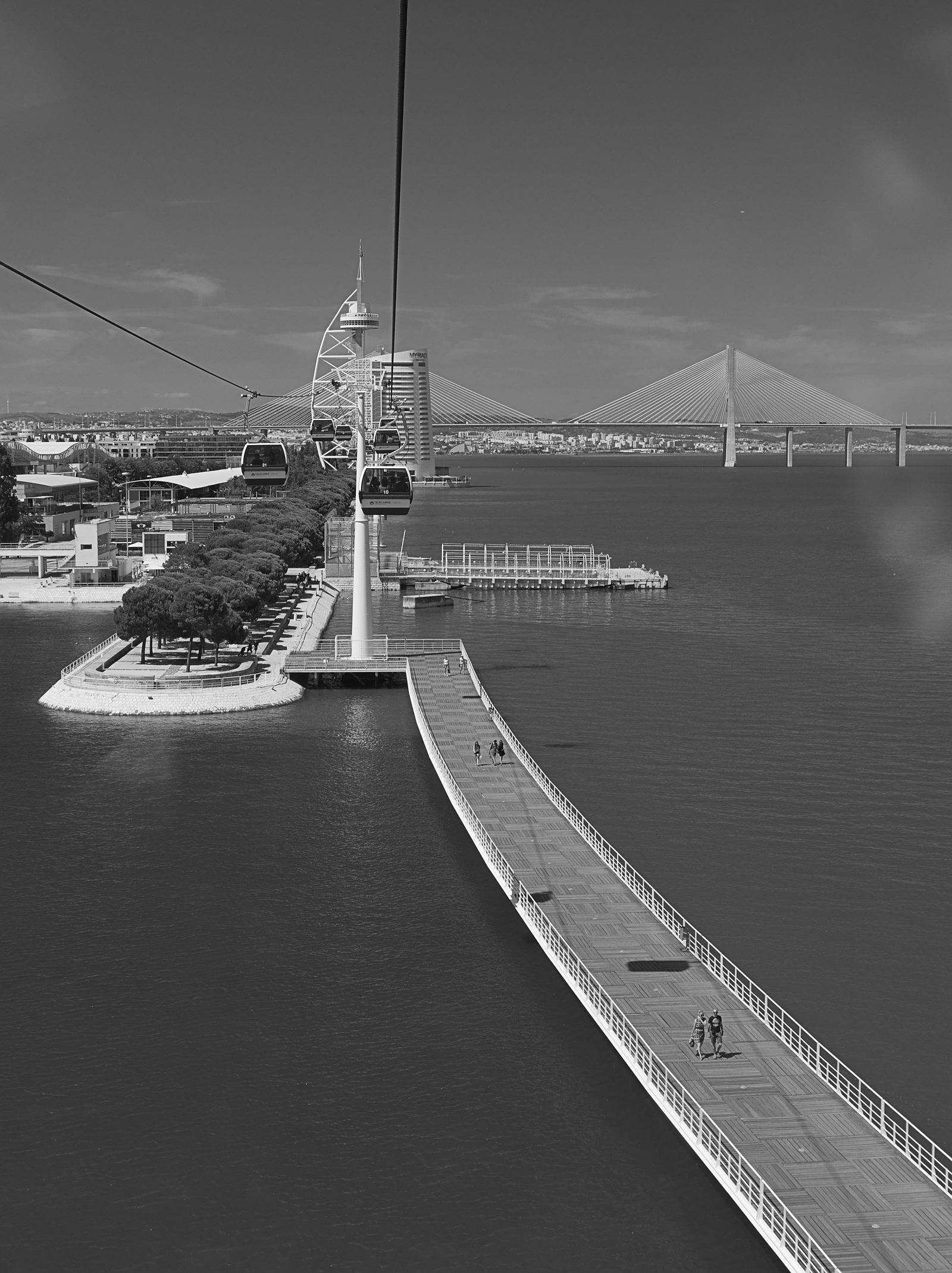
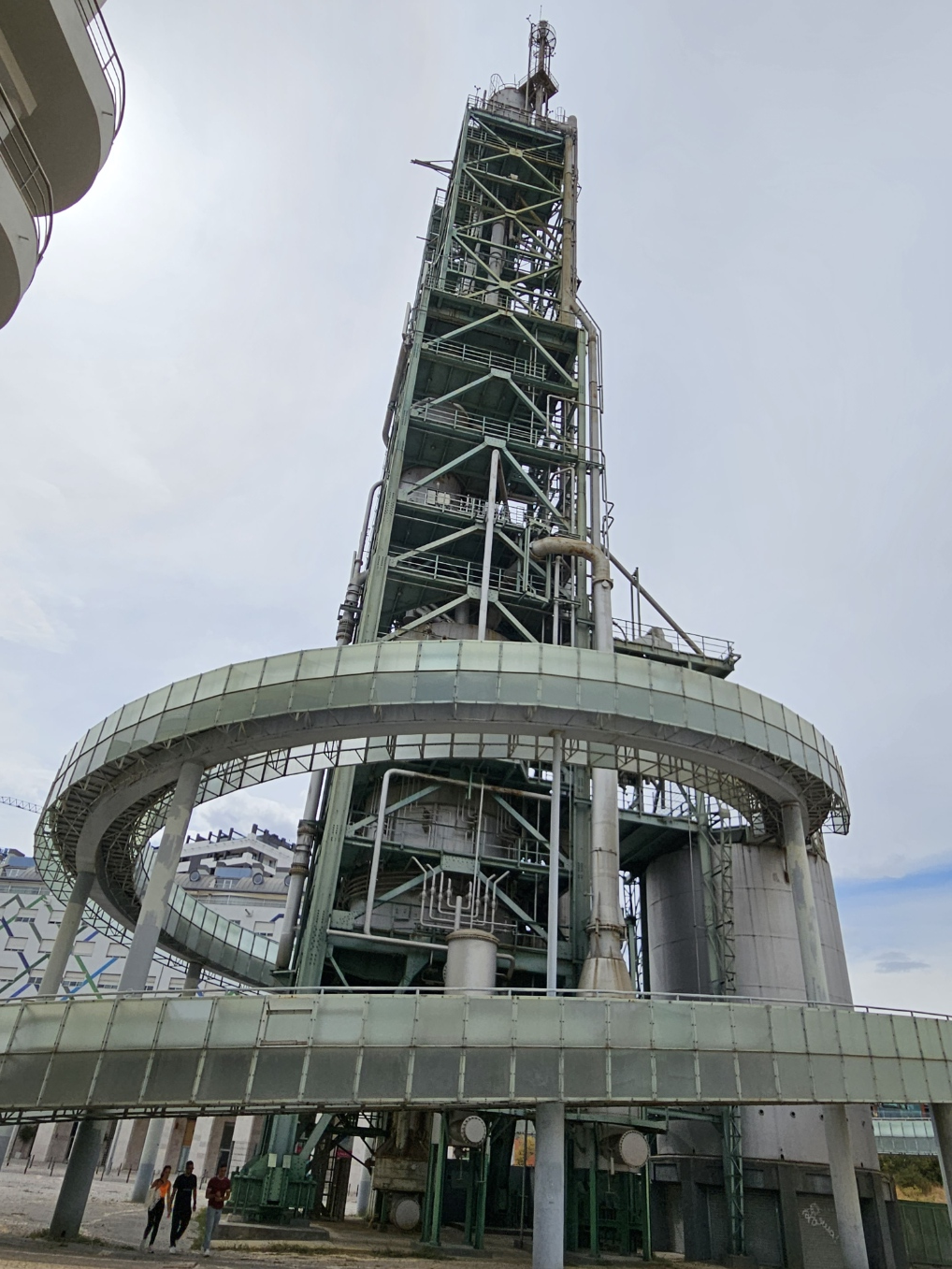
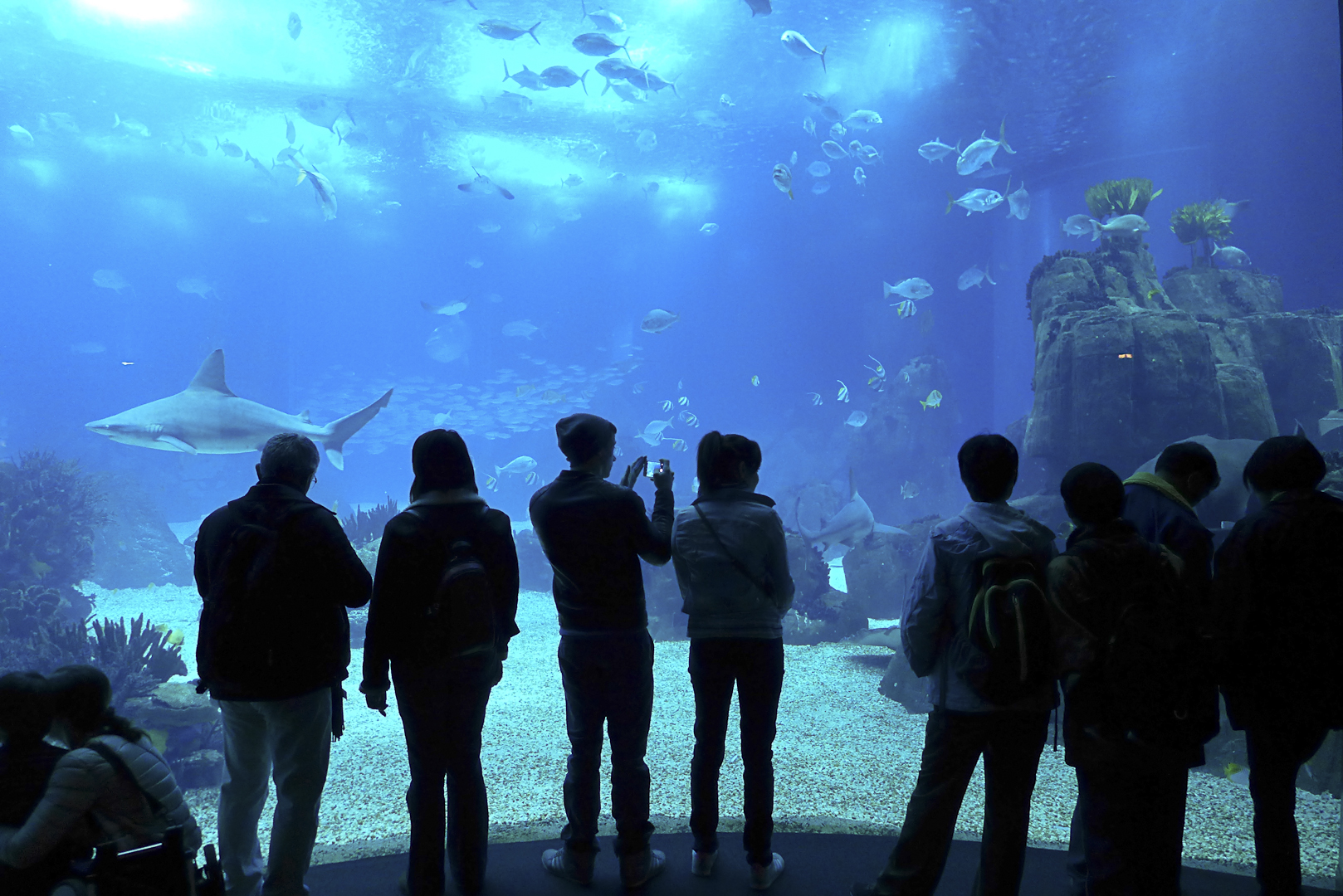
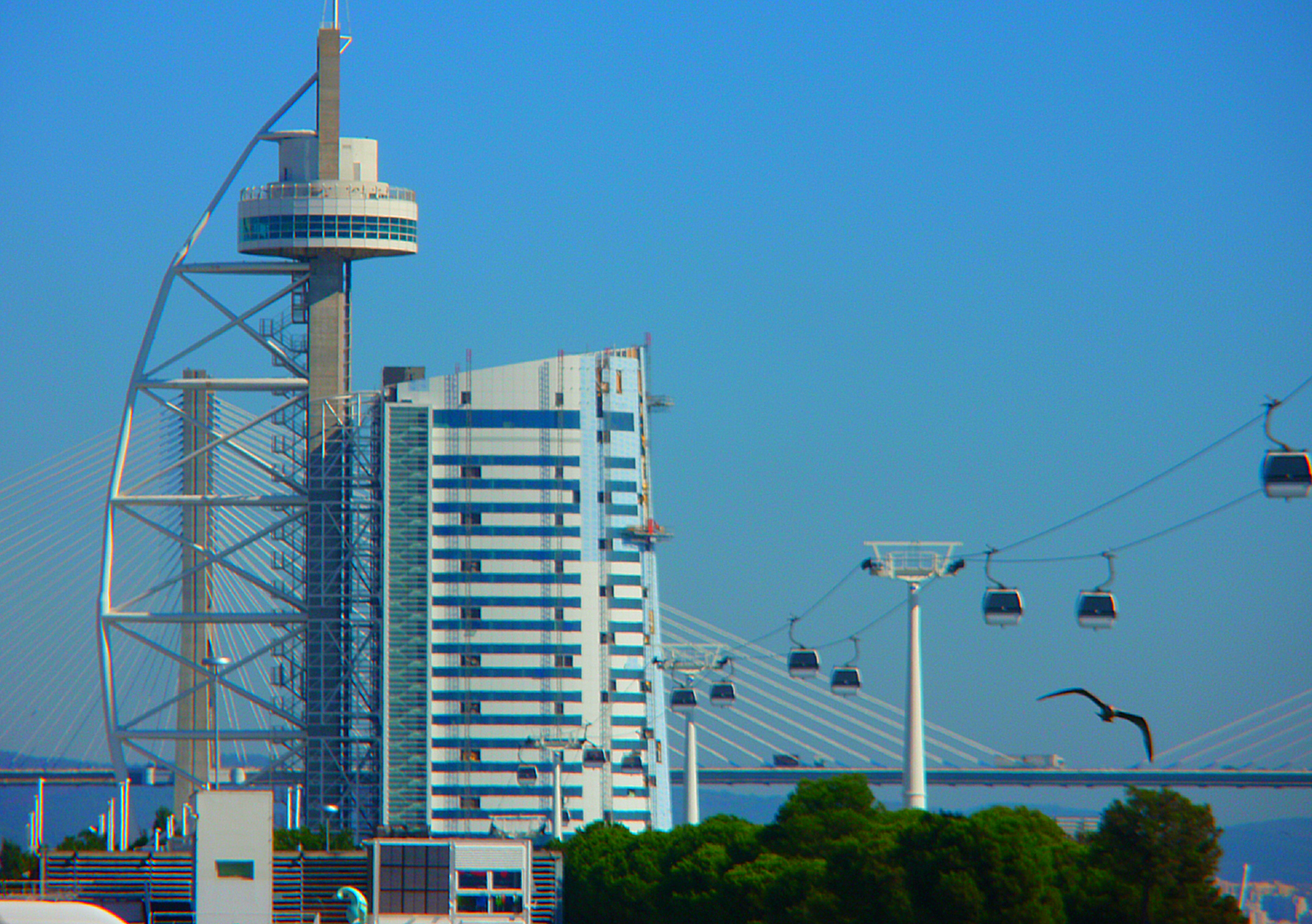
- Clockwise: Gare do Oriente; Industrial archaeology; View of the Tagus promenade; Vasco da Gama Tower; Oceanário; Alameda dos Oceanos

- Coordinates: 38.768°N 9.094°W
- Country: Portugal
- Region: Lisbon
- Metropolitan area: Lisbon
- District: Lisbon
- Municipality: Lisbon

Area
  - Total: 5.44 km^{2} (2.10 sq mi)

Population (2021)
  - Total: 22,382
  - Density: 4,110/km^{2} (10,700/sq mi)
- Time zone: UTC+00:00 (WET)
  - Summer (DST): UTC+01:00 (WEST)
- Patron: Our Lady of Navigators
- Website: jf-parquedasnacoes.pt

The Parque das Nações (Portuguese pronunciation: [ˈpaɾkɨ ðɐʒ nɐˈsõjʃ]; Park of the Nations), colloquially known as Expo (as the site of the 1998 Lisbon World Exposition), is a freguesia (civil parish) and typical quarter of Lisbon, the capital city of Portugal. Located in eastern Lisbon, Parque das Nações is to the east of Olivais, northeast of Marvila, and directly south of Lisbon's border with Loures. The population in 2021 was 22,382.

== History ==
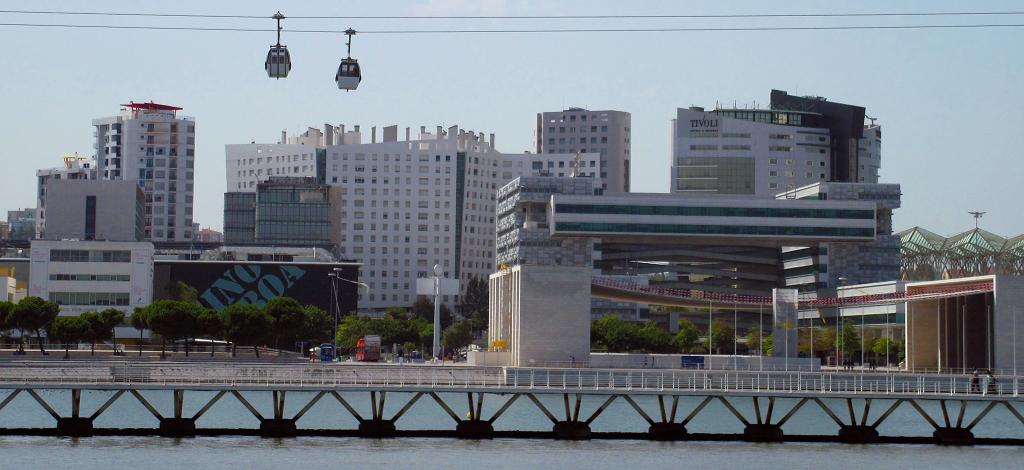
Casino Lisboa (left) and Vodafone Portugal HQ (right) from the Tagus

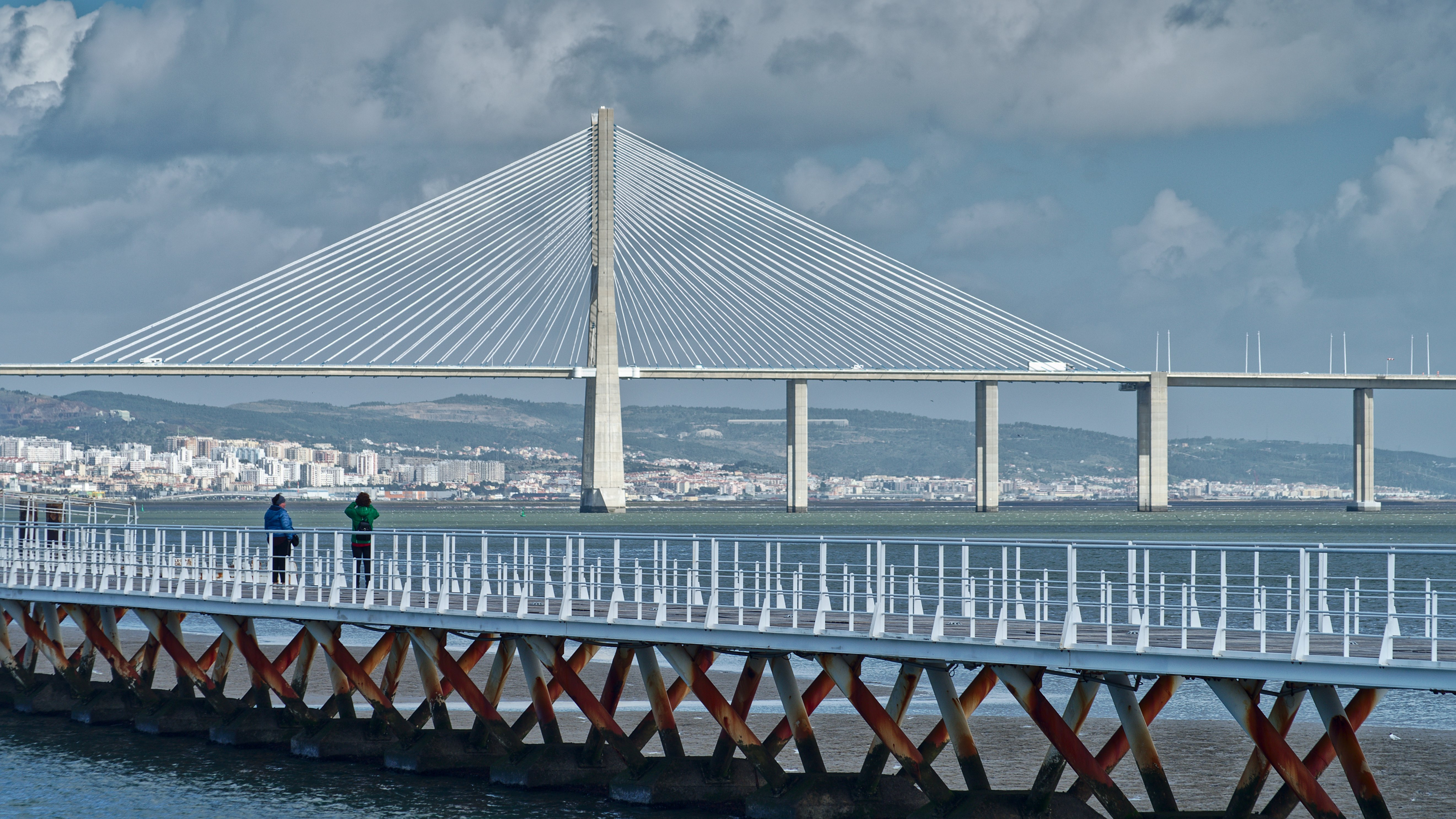
The Vasco da Gama Bridge, the longest bridge in the European Union

Parque das Nações was the designation given to the neighborhood that emerged within the former Intervention Zone of Expo, encompassing the site where the 1998 World Expo was held as well as all areas that were under the administration of ParqueExpo, S.A. This area has since become a hub of cultural activities and a new district of the city, hosting various cultural and sporting institutions of its own.

The contemporary architecture of Parque das Nações, along with its social spaces and the entire urbanization and urban requalification project, has injected new vitality into the eastern part of Lisbon, once an industrial area until the 1990s.

Notable architectural landmarks in Parque das Nações include the striking vaults on the platforms of Gare do Oriente, designed by Santiago Calatrava, which define his architectural style. The Pavilion of Portugal, by Portuguese architect Álvaro Siza Vieira, which has an entrance featuring an imposing pre-stressed concrete canopy, based on the concept of a sheet of paper resting on two bricks, opening up the space to the city to accommodate the various events that a space of this scale hosts.

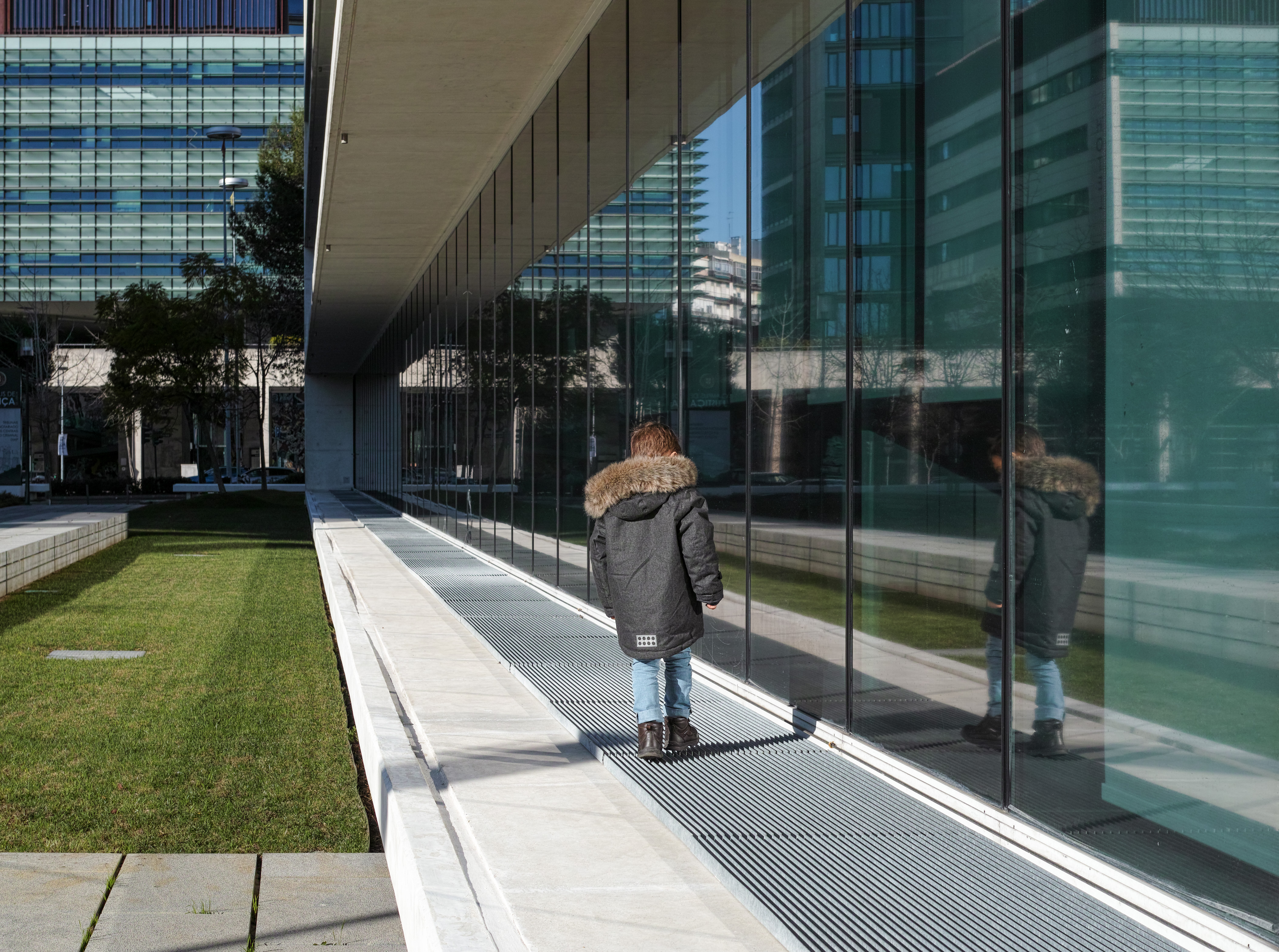
Campus de Justiça de Lisboa

The Park boasts the Knowledge Pavilion, a contemporary science and technology museum with numerous interactive exhibits. A cable car provides transportation for visitors across the former exhibition area. Additionally, noteworthy attractions include the Pavilhão Atlântico (now known as Altice Arena), the iconic Vasco da Gama Tower (the country's tallest building), the Lisbon Oceanarium (one of the world's largest aquariums), and the Church of Nossa Senhora dos Navegantes, completed in March 2014.

The Patriarchate of Lisbon established the parish of Nossa Senhora dos Navegantes within the territory of the proposed parish, distinct from the parishes of Santa Maria dos Olivais, Santo António de Moscavide, and Nossa Senhora da Purificação de Sacavém.

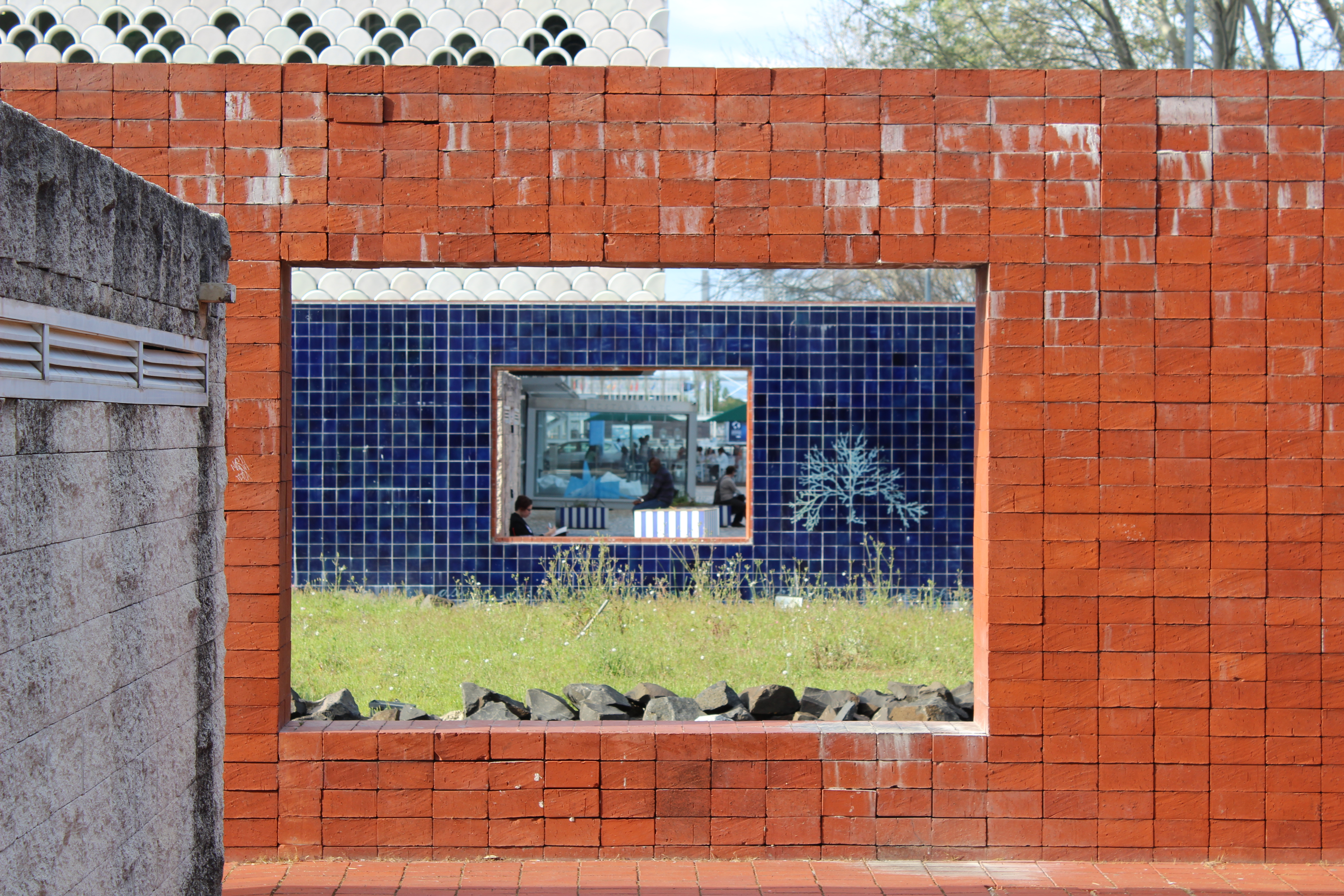
Oriente view

Leveraging its strategic geographical location, the Park is home to a modern marina. The Parque das Nações Marina offers 600 mooring posts for recreational boats and is equipped with infrastructure to host major nautical events, featuring an event pier and a Pier Bridge not only for cruise boats or large historical vessels but also as a support area for land events. Situated within the Tagus Estuary Nature Reserve, the marina is characterized by its distinct natural setting.

The community of Parque das Nações has given rise to various entities and organizations, such as the Clube Parque das Nações and the Association of Residents and Traders of Parque das Nações, alongside numerous businesses and institutions

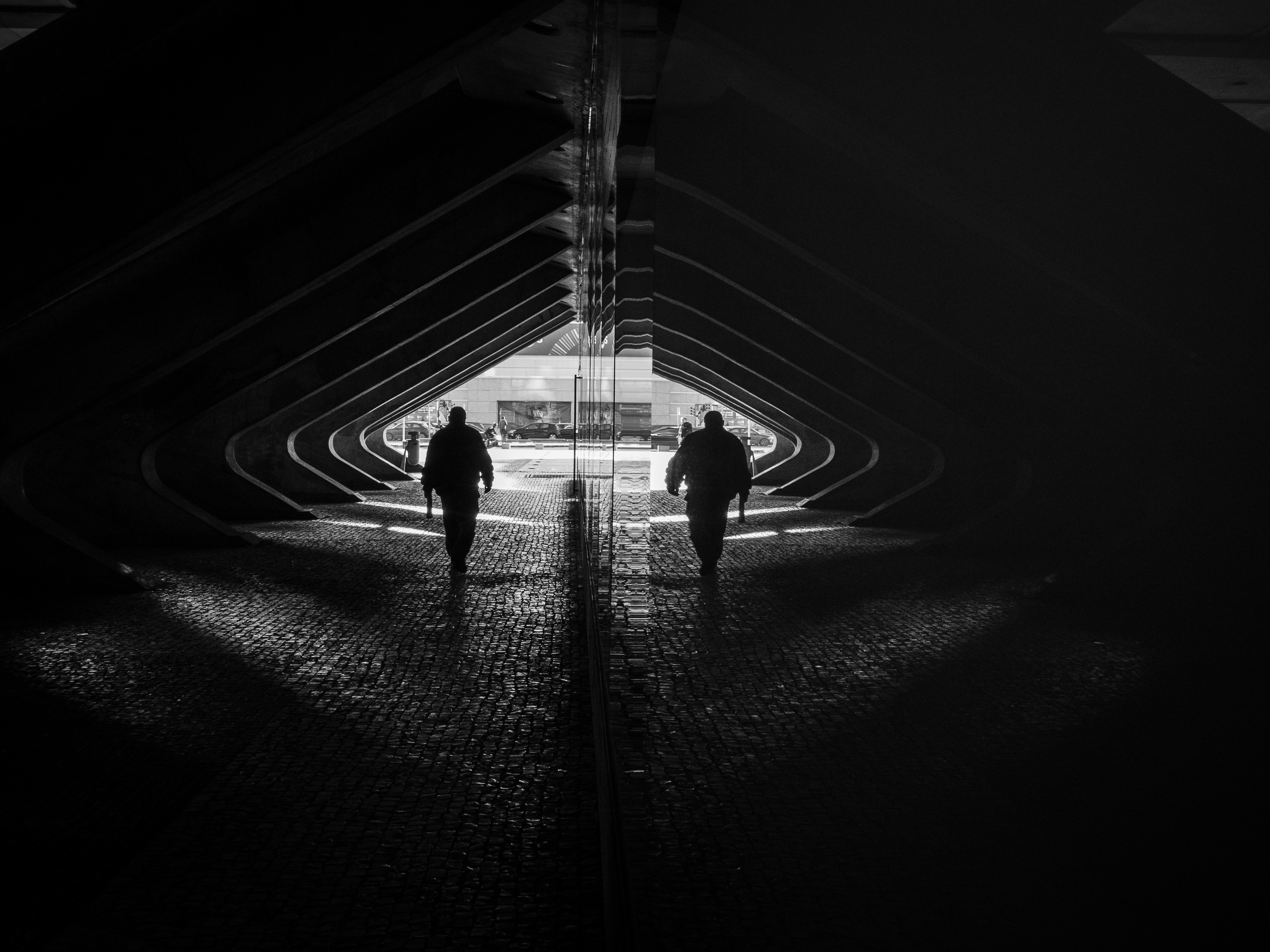
Oriente pedestrian tunnel

The district was laid out in 1998 as the site of the 1998 Lisbon World Exposition. Following Expo '98, the area was transformed into a modern commercial and residential district, known as the Parque das Nações (Park of the Nations).

After the International Exposition of 1998, the area assumed its current name and underwent significant transformations, including the construction of a new shopping center, an international exhibition complex, several hotels, many new offices and residential buildings, and a casino. Parque das Nações is also a perfect spot for birdwatchers, as its proximity to the Tagus Estuary allows for the observation of various bird species.

In 2004, "Oriente" was initially proposed as the designation for a prospective new freguesia within the municipality of Lisbon.

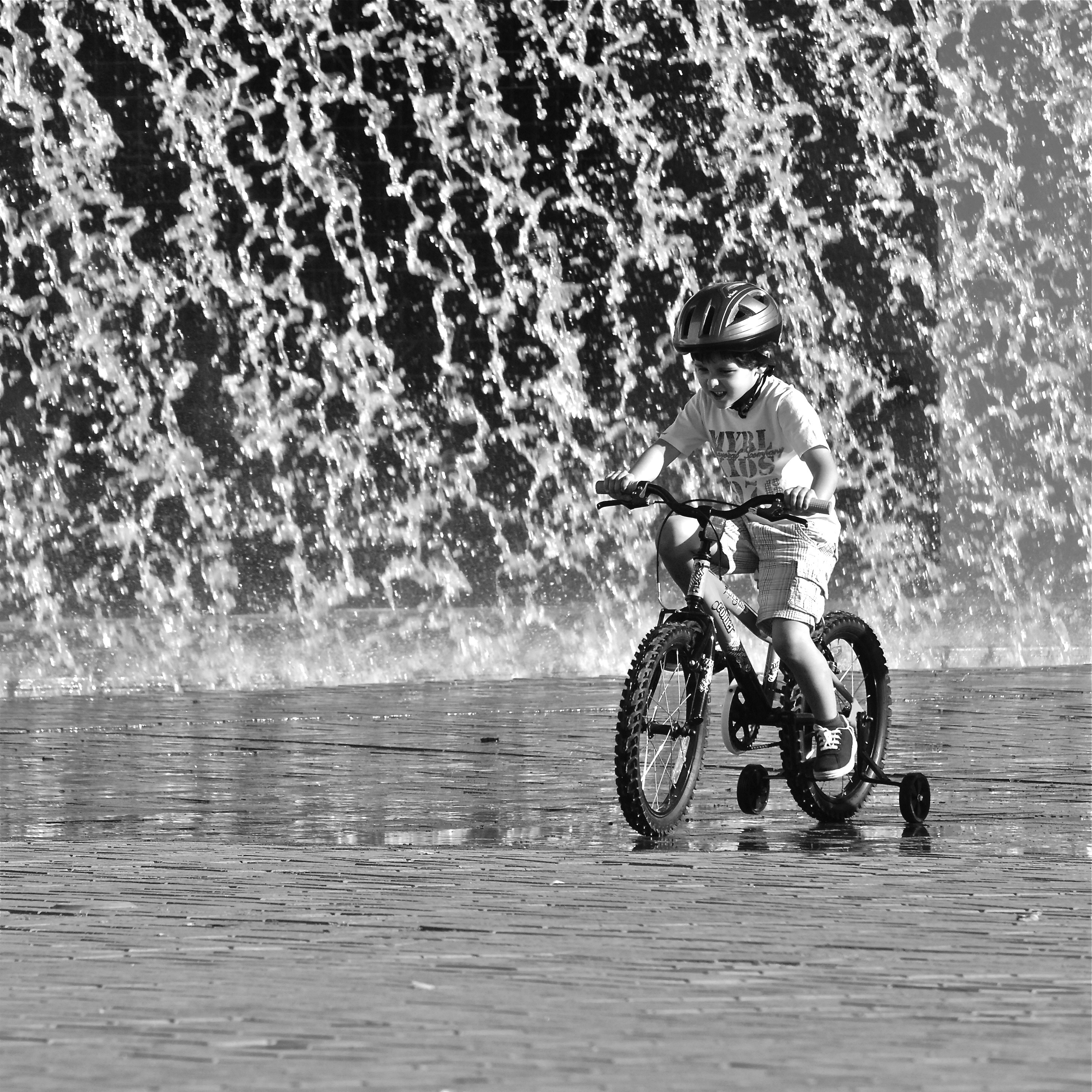
Water games in the parish

This proposed parish would have encompassed the entirety of Lisbon's Parque das Nações, consolidating an area previously divided among the parishes of Moscavide, Sacavém (both under the jurisdiction of the municipality of Loures), and Santa Maria dos Olivais (a parish within the municipality of Lisbon). Its northern boundary would have been delineated by the Trancão River, while the eastern boundary would have been formed by the Tagus River, the longest river in the Iberian Peninsula. To the south, its limits would have extended to Avenida Infante D. Henrique (part of the parish of Santa Maria dos Olivais), and to the west, it would have been demarcated by the Northern Railway Line, thus separating it from the parishes of Santa Maria dos Olivais, Moscavide, and Sacavém.

The creation of the parish was envisaged in a bill proposed by the parliamentary groups of the PSD and CDS/PP parties, which expired with the dissolution of the Assembly of the Republic in 2004. In the subsequent legislative term, in 2005, the same bill was reintroduced by a PSD deputy and referred to the Committee on Local Government, Environment, and Territorial Planning of the Assembly of the Republic for further evaluation and discussion.

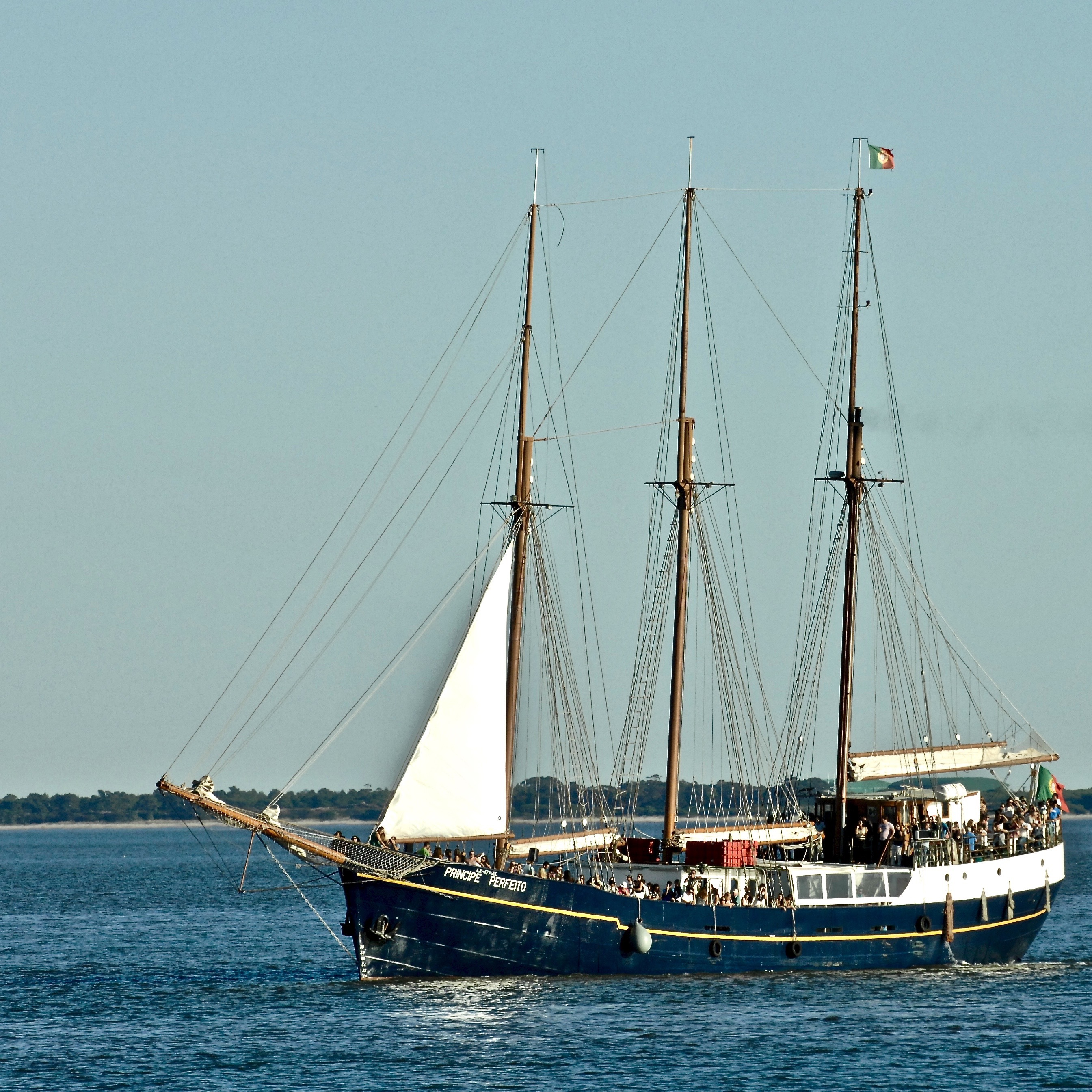
Sailing boat "Principe Perfeito" ascending the Tagus River

The bill presented statistical indicators demonstrating that the proposed parish met all the requirements for the creation of new parishes in the territory of mainland Portugal, specifically within the municipality of Lisbon, which has more stringent rules regarding parish creation.

The Residents' and Merchants' Association of Parque das Nações supported the creation of the parish, stating it was essential to maintain cohesion within the urban space inherited from Expo '98. Parties and organizations advocating for this administrative change emphasized that it would be the most rational way to manage an area like Parque das Nações, which at that time was divided among three parishes and two municipalities.

Furthermore, these organizations argued that there was a discrepancy between the fiscal reality and the administrative reality. At that time, the municipality of Loures did not administer any part of the territory of Parque das Nações – for example, it did not manage the water distribution or other municipal services – unlike the portion belonging to the municipality of Lisbon. Despite not directly participating in the administration of the Park, the Municipal Chamber of Loures received municipal taxes from it, and the population of that area voted for institutions within the municipality of Loures.

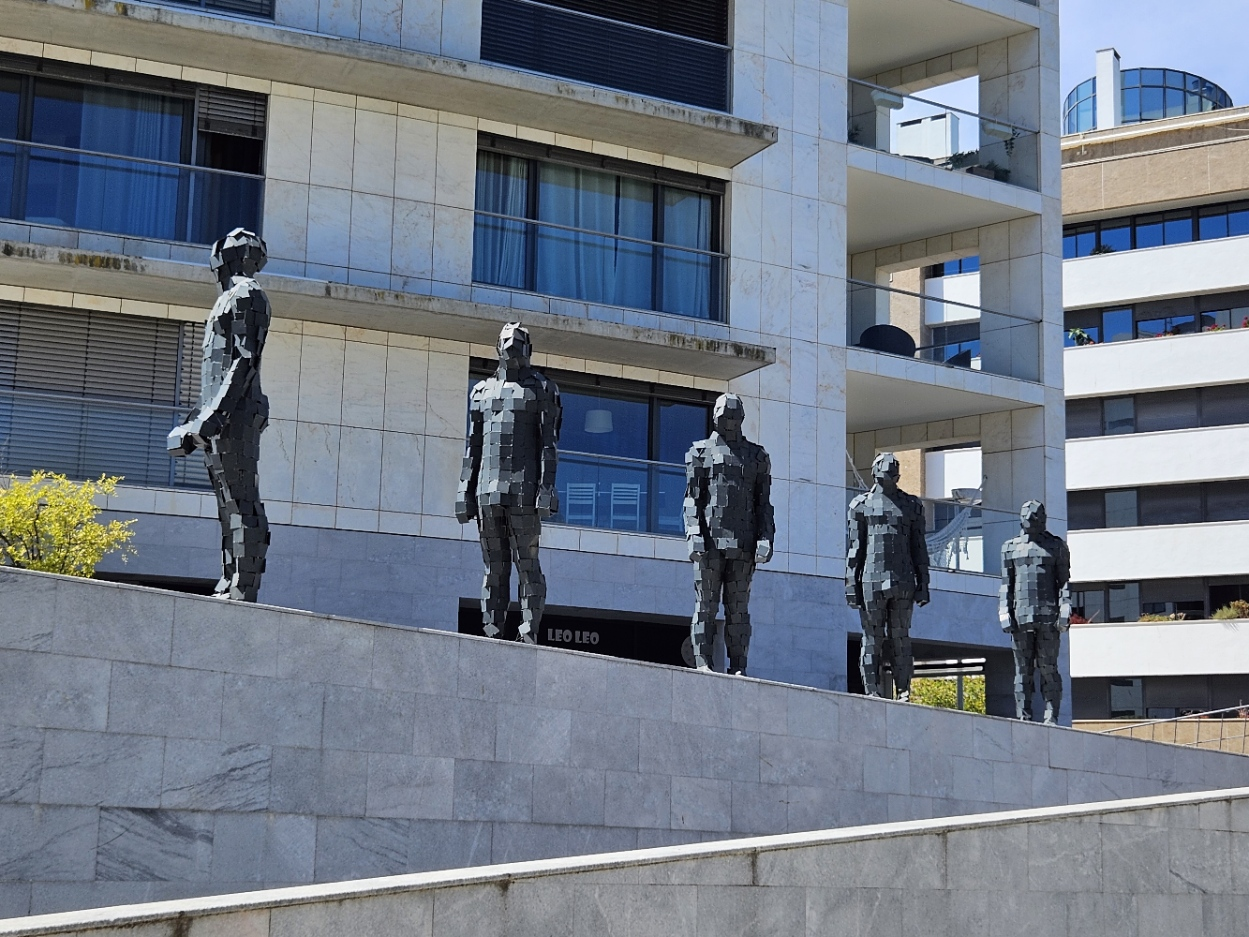
O Homem Muralha by Pedro Pires

It is worth noting that all organizations and resident groups of Parque das Nações expressed support for the creation of the parish for quite some time. Therefore, within the population directly affected by the matter, there was no divergence regarding the necessity of its establishment. The population regarded the tripartite administrative division as a legacy from the pre-Expo '98 era, outdated in light of the current reality. The creation of the new parish would simplify the administration of Parque das Nações after the area's return to municipal control, which was planned for 2009.

In functional terms, the entire Parque das Nações operated, de facto, as a neighborhood of the city of Lisbon (albeit the most recent one), and its inhabitants identified themselves as such.

It is important to highlight that the area that was supposed to be withdrawn from the parish of Moscavide was never administered by it, and the area that was supposed to be withdrawn from the parish of Sacavém has not been so for several decades: until the beginning of the Expo '98 project, they were administered by the Port of Lisbon; thereafter, they had been under the administration of Parque Expo, S.A.

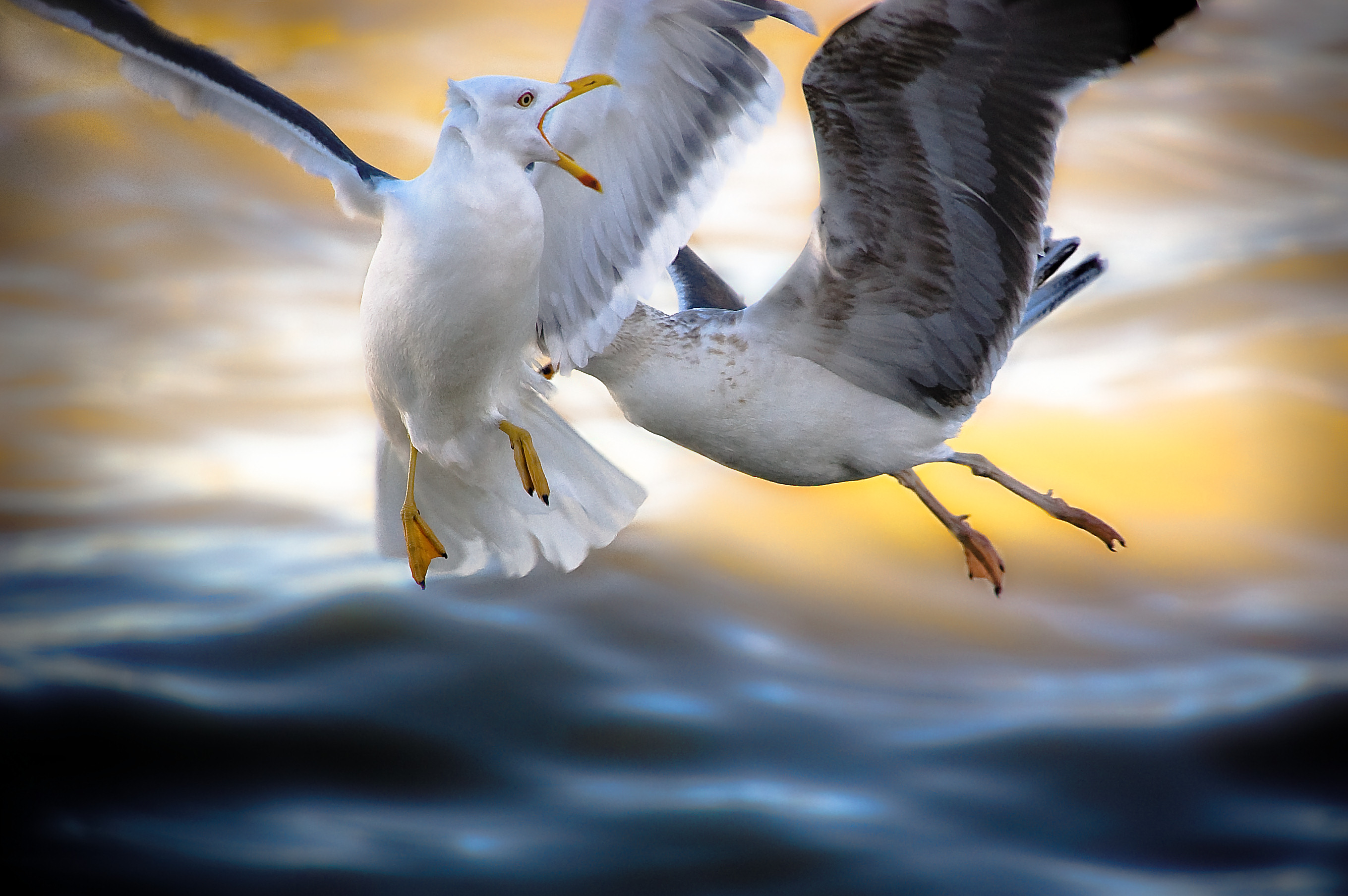
Seagulls are a frequent sight in the parish, here depicted near the Marina

On the other hand, such desire is generally rejected by the inhabitants of Sacavém and Moscavide (however, only those residing outside the territory of Parque das Nações).

At the level of local administration, the municipality of Loures fears losing revenue from municipal taxes paid by the inhabitants of the Parque das Nações area with the creation of the parish, as well as being deprived of more territory (already in 1998, with the secession of Odivelas to form a new municipality, the municipality of Loures was significantly reduced).

In Sacavém, the parish assembly unanimously voted on a non-binding motion unfavorable to the creation of such parish. The president of the Moscavide parish council only agrees with the creation of the parish if it were to be integrated into the municipality of Loures (this proposal does not find resonance among the population of Parque das Nações, as the Expo and the Park are developments of the city of Lisbon). Lastly, the mayor of Santa Maria dos Olivais has also publicly expressed disagreement with the possible fragmentation of territory within his parish.

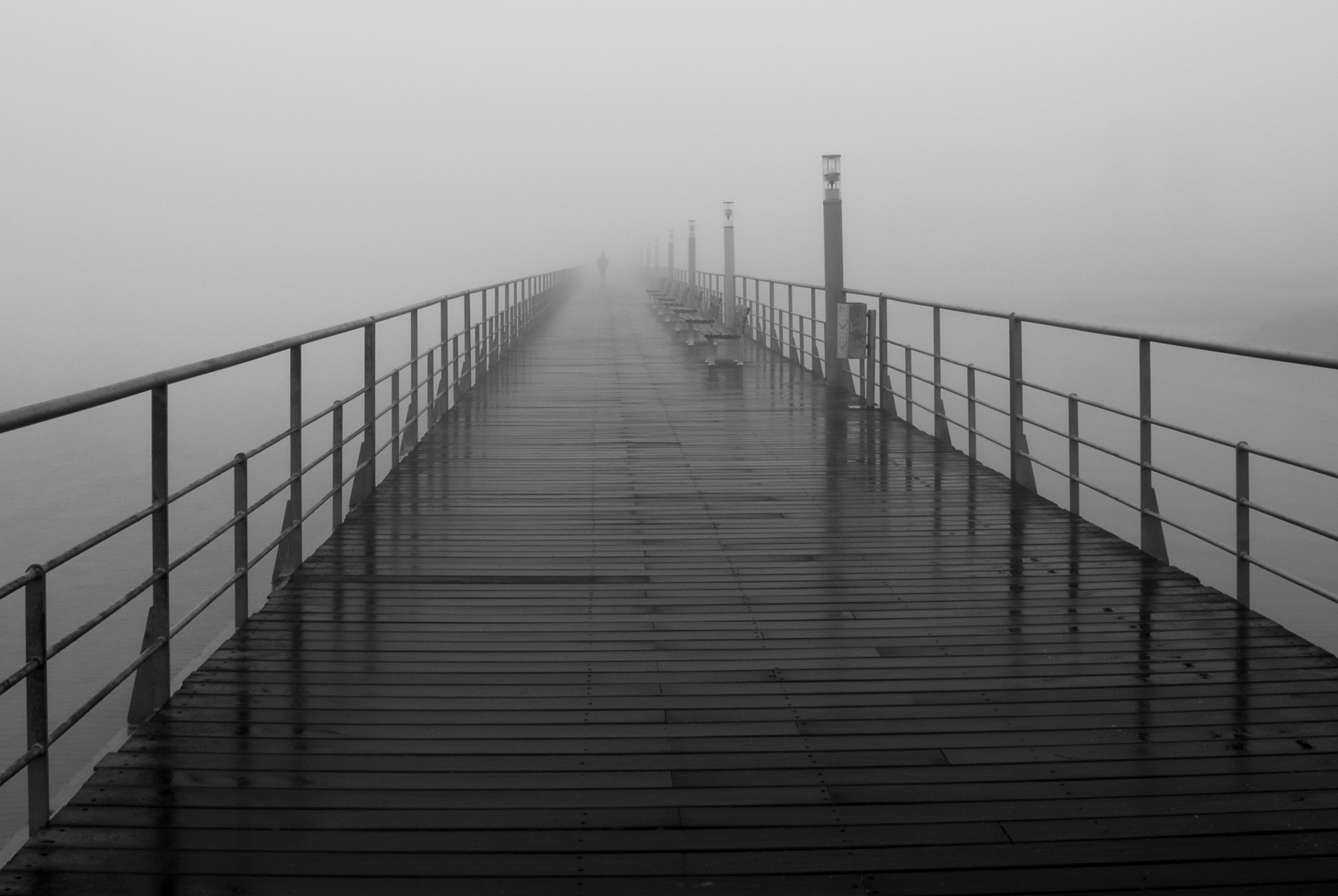
One of the many docks along Tagus river, in a foggy day

All parties represented in the Municipal Assembly of Lisbon advocated for the integration of the territory earmarked for the Oriente parish into the municipality of Lisbon. However, some advocated for the integration of the same territory into the Santa Maria dos Olivais parish, which would allow for the incorporation of Parque das Nações into a single parish without creating new structures, merely adjusting the boundary of Lisbon to include the area currently belonging to the municipality of Loures.

There was also a proposal for the creation of a new municipality that would encompass Parque das Nações and the parishes of Moscavide, Santa Maria dos Olivais, and Portela. Several possible names for the new municipality were suggested, including Oriente, Vasco da Gama, and Foz do Tejo.

At the time of the census carried out in 2011, an estimated 21,000 people lived in the Parque das Nações, which was shared between the Lisbon and Loures municipalities until November 2012. Following a request by local citizens for the municipality of Lisbon to annex the one belonging to Loures, thereby integrating the entire area within the Lisbon municipality, the area is now inside Lisbon and it is the city's most northeastern parish.

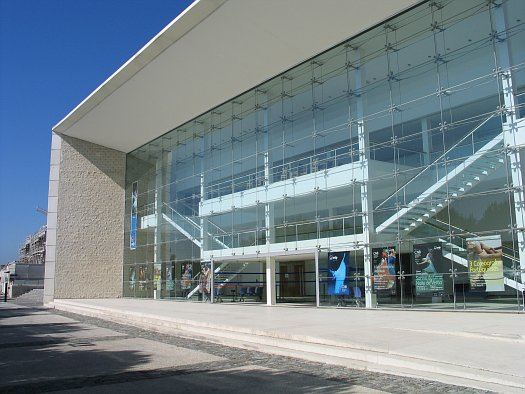
Camões theatre

The freguesia was created in 2012 from parts of the parishes Santa Maria dos Olivais (Lisbon), Sacavém and Moscavide (both part of Loures municipality).

The creation of the parish of Parque das Nações resulted in an increase in the area of the municipality of Lisbon by approximately 1.87 km^{2}, and an equivalent decrease in the area of the municipality of Loures. This was due to the transfer of territory from Loures to Lisbon, situated between the railway line and the River Tagus, and between the former boundary line of the municipalities and the River Trancão.

== Marina ==
Taking advantage of its geographical position, Parque das Nações also has a brand new marina, Marina Parque das Nações featuring 600 berths and modern infrastructures, a river pier for cruises or historical vessels and an exclusive pontoon prepared to receive nautical and on land events, and a spot for bird watching as it is sited in the Tagus Estuary, one of the largest and most diverse estuaries of Europe.

== Economy ==
=== Employment ===
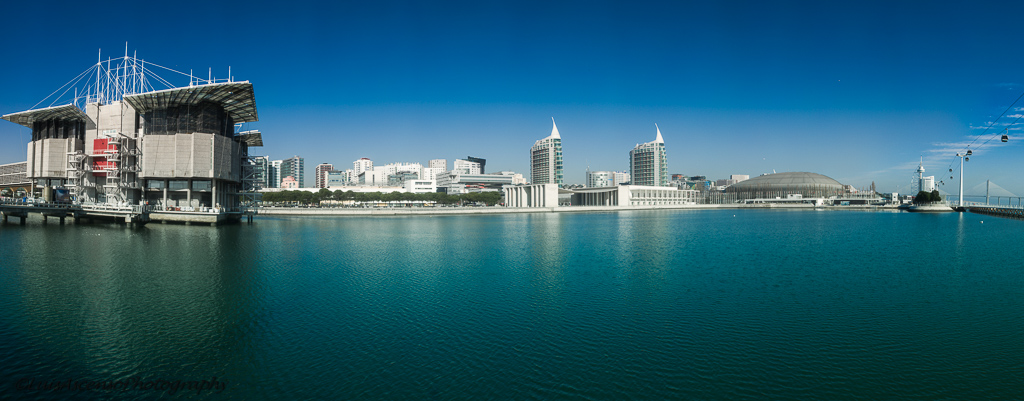
Parish panorama

In the parish of Parque das Nações there are, as of 2021, 765 residents who were unemployed. Of these, 39.48% received a state-fund subsidy or pension (41.34% in Lisbon). In 2021 the unemployment rate in the parish is considerably lower than the one recorded for Lisbon and for Portugal as a whole, standing at 6.98%. In the same year, Portugal as a whole had an unemployment rate of 8.13% that has progressively decreased to 6.1% in 2023. As the statistics dealing with unemployment at the parish level are available only every 10 years, the current (2023) unemployment rate in Parque das Nações is unknown. Among youth aged 15–24 the unemployment rate in 2021 in the parish stood at 24.55%, 31.42% higher than in the rest of the country (or, equivalently, a share 5.87 percentage points higher than that found in Portugal as a whole).

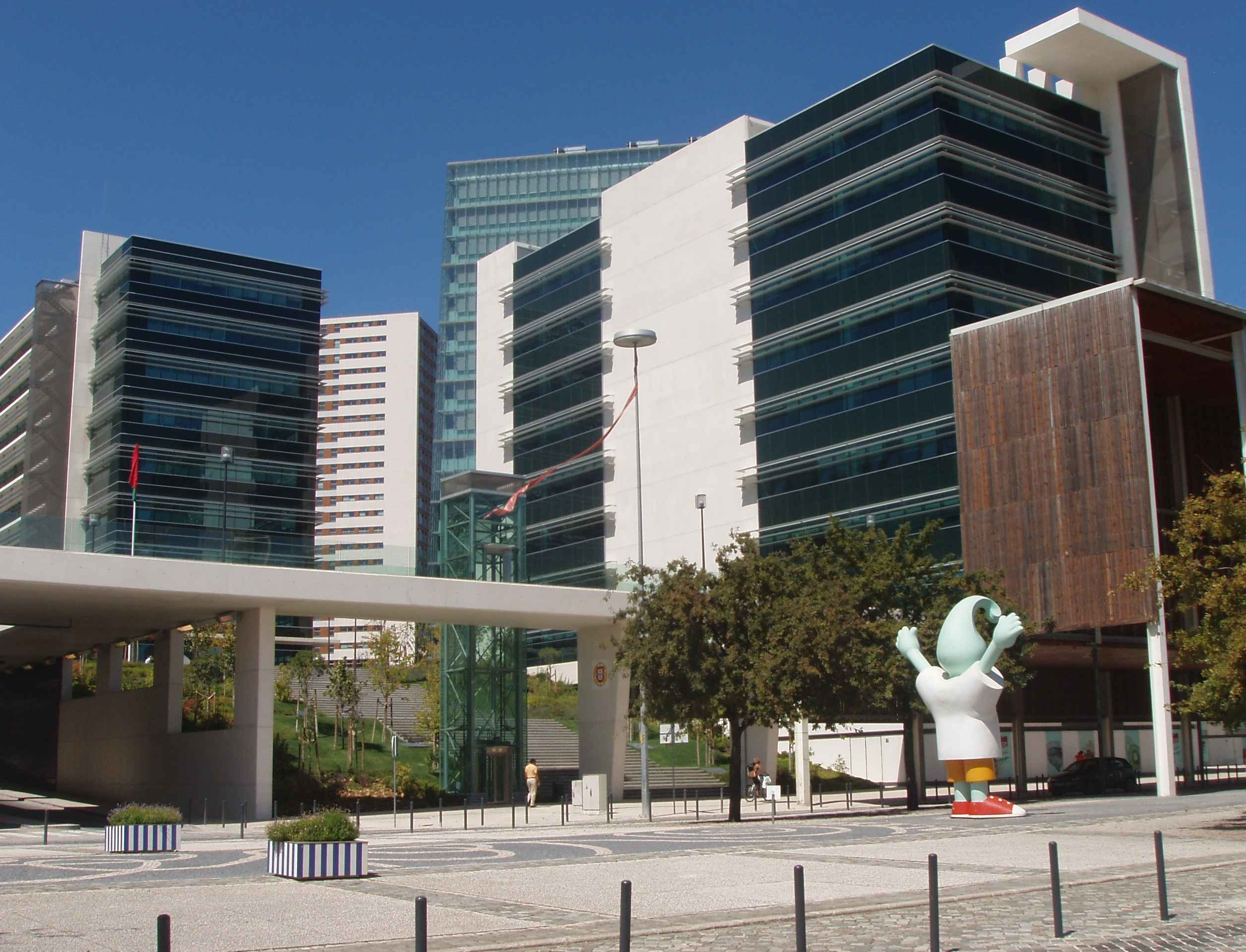
Parish streetview

On the other hand, in 2021 10,201 residents were employed, of which 73.02% were employees and 24.86% were independent workers. The low share of people aged 20–24 employed is due to the fact that many are still in education (e.g. university) while the low proportion of those in employment aged 60–64 is due to many being early pensioners.

2021 Census data	Age group								
2021 Census data	20–24	25–29	30–34	35–39	40–44	45–49	50–54	55–59	60–64
Share of people in employment	26.08%	69.89%	76.54%	79.90%	81.30%	85.30%	81.38%	72.48%	53.66%

Dealing with commuting, the residents of Parque das Nações spent 22.72 minutes of daily commuting, slightly more than the average inhabitant of Lisbon.

=== Social conditions ===
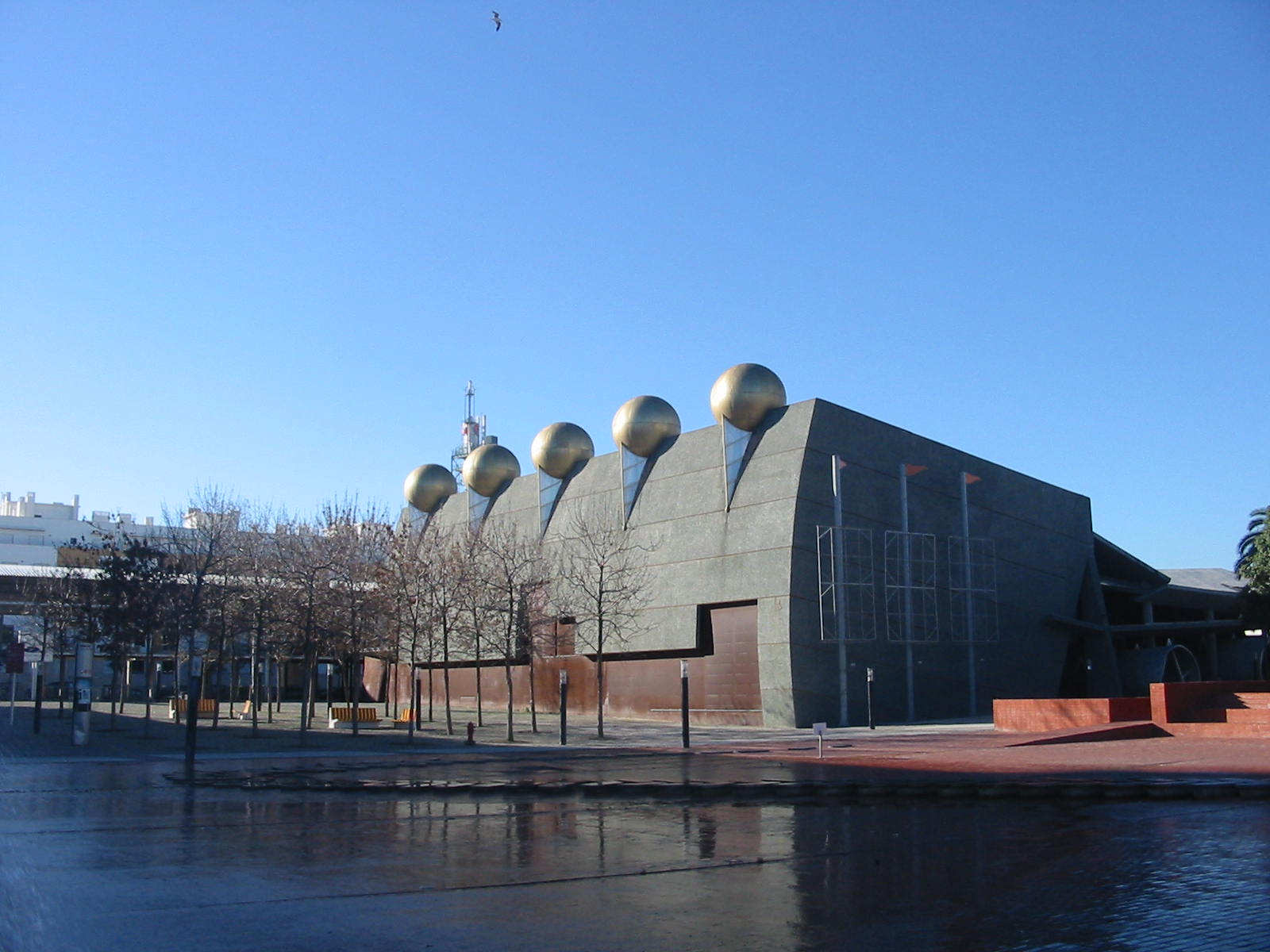
Architecture in the parish

Dealing with overcrowding in the parish's households, 5.10% of the population lives in accommodations where they have less than 15 m^{2} per capita (8.71% for Lisbon and 5.65% in Portugal as a whole), while 47.31% live in houses with more than 40 m^{2} per capita (39.64% for Lisbon and 46.84% in Portugal as a whole). There are 2,081.8 dwellings per km^{2} (3,200.5 for Lisbon and 64.9 in Portugal as a whole).

63.2% of the population lives in owned dwellings as of 2021; this is higher than the value recorded for Lisbon (50.3%) but significantly lower than the one recorded for Portugal (70%). The average height of a residential building in Parque das Nações is 7.2 floors as of 2021 and the average area of a dwelling stands at 112.45 m^{2} (with the average in Lisbon-city 93.07 m^{2} being and in Portugal 112.45 m^{2}).

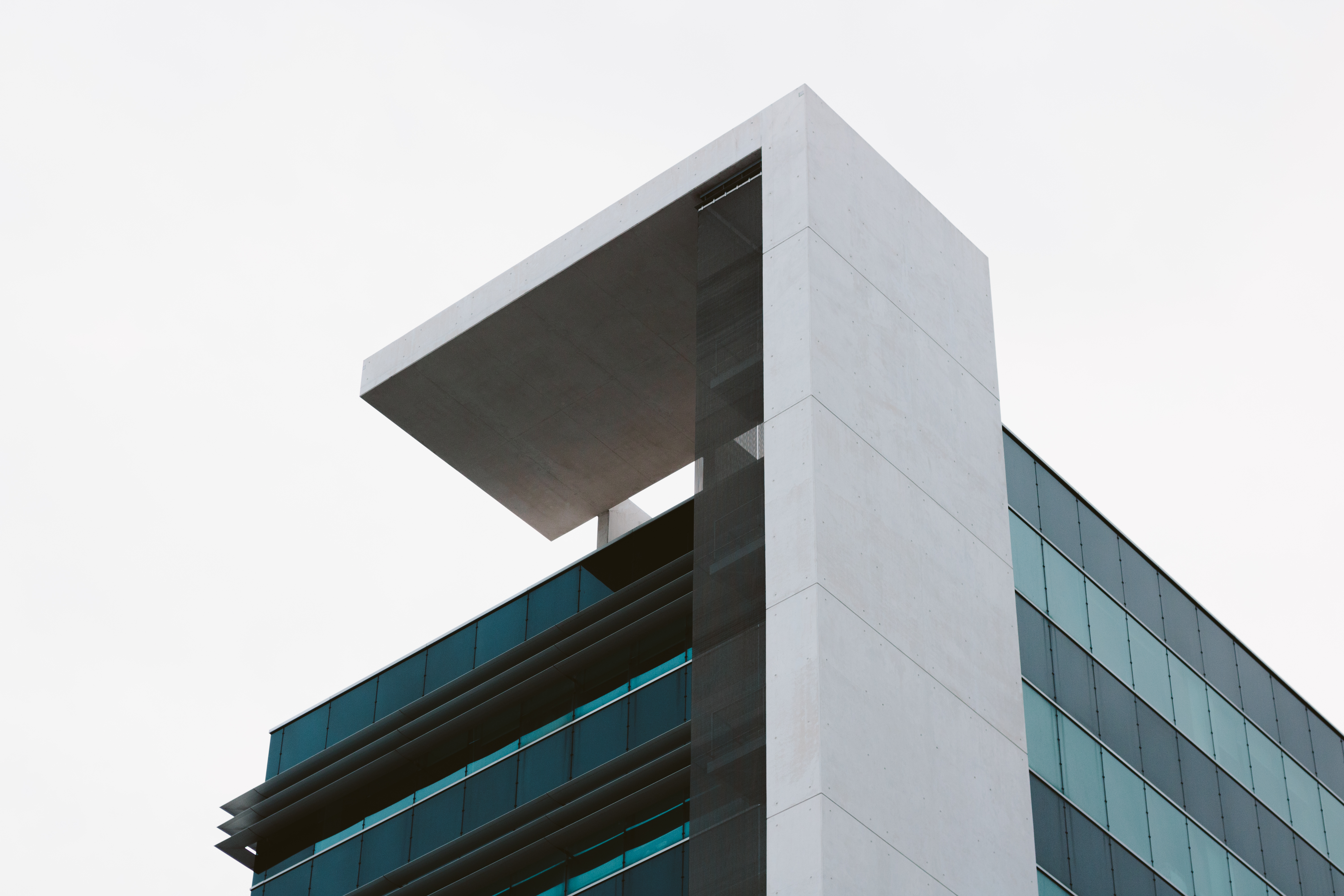
Modern architecture in Parque das Nações

The average monthly rent value of leased dwellings recorded in 2021 stood at €575.26, 22.17% higher than the Lisbon average in the same year (€470.87). It is nonetheless important to notice that the value of the rents is quite low because of many contracts stipulated decades ago, with 34.70% (25.34% in Lisbon) of the dwellers paying less than €150/month because of the rent-freezing system that was adopted in Portugal in the late XX century, allowing that many people, now mostly elders, don't have to pay high rents. Due to the housing crisis and inflation, in 2023 the average rent for new contracts (frozen contracts aren't concerned) stood in fact at almost €18/m^{2} in Parque das Nações, meaning that for the average 112.45 m^{2} dwelling are necessary around €2,024/month.

Dealing with housing prices, it is interesting to remark that if the median price per m^{2} stood at €2,860 for a house sold in early 2016, this value had risen to €4,000/m^{2} in early 2021 and to €5,013/m^{2} in 2023, experiencing a growth of +75.28% in just 7 years. In the same period the growth of house priced per m^{2} in Lisbon as a whole was +117.6%, from €1,875/m^{2} to €4,080/m^{2}.

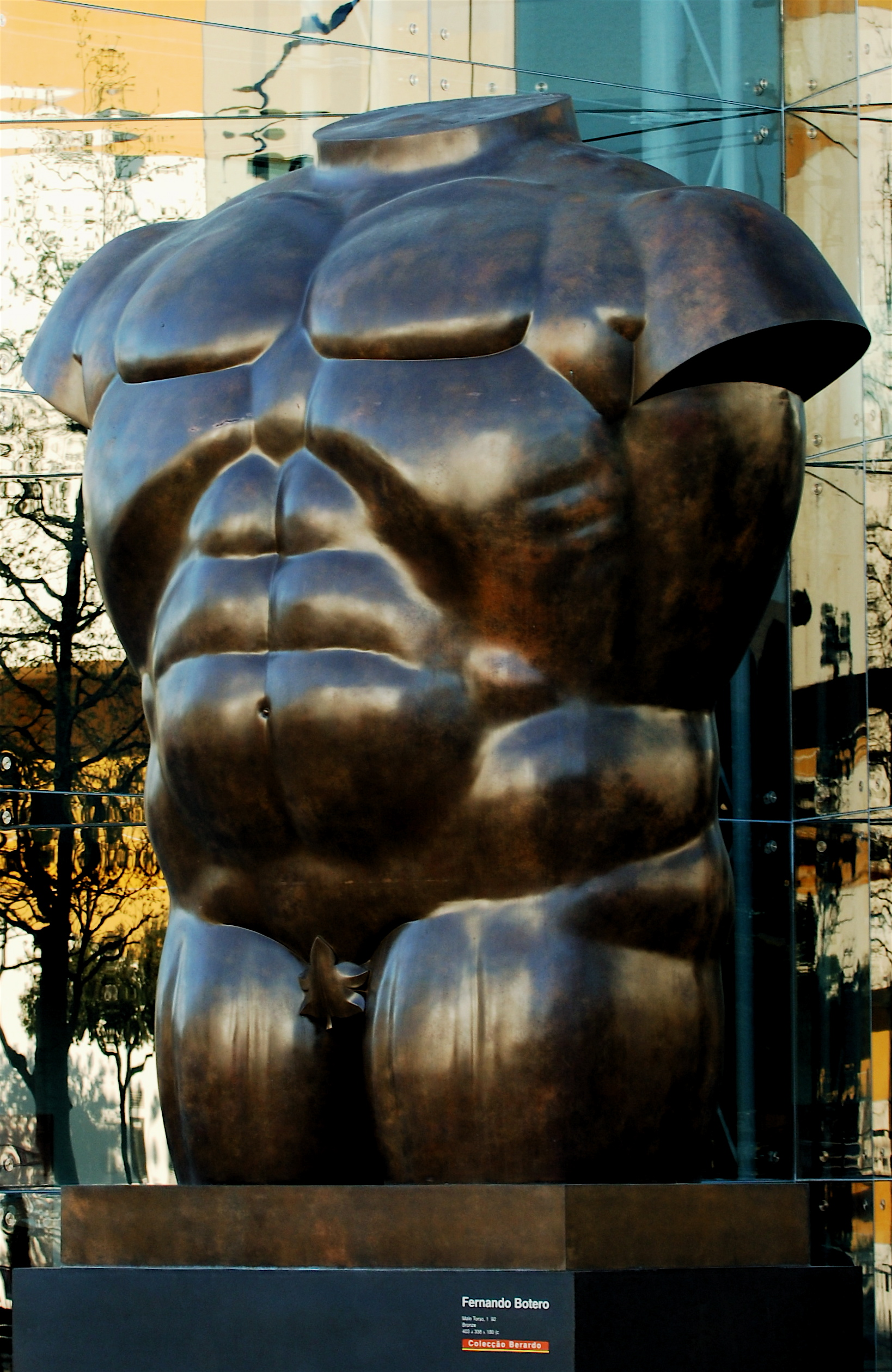
Botero's sculpture

Of the 777 residential buildings listed in the parish, 8.62% were built before 1919, 0.90% from 1919 to 1960, 17.50% from 1961 to 1990, 27.03% from 1991 to 2000 and 45.95% after 2001. Of the buildings built before 1919 100% had 1 to 3 floors, while in buildings built between 1981 and 2010 the proportion of buildings with 6 stories or more is 81.39%. Interestingly, the newer and higher the building the higher the probability of it being served by an elevator. For homes built before 1946, 0% have access to an elevator as of 2021; this percentage ascends to 88.87% for buildings dating from 1981 to 2010. Always with regard to amenities, 38.16% of the houses had access to air conditioning (20.98% in Lisbon), 78.09% to heating (69.62% in Lisbon) and 74.64% to a parking place (28.04% in Lisbon).

As of 2021 there were 1,151 vacant dwelling in the parish. Of the vacant dwellings, 495 are vacant for rental or with the purpose of being sold, while 656 are vacant for other reasons, often abandoned, awaiting their demolition or because a reason for conflict among heirs. Moreover, as of 2023 490 apartments are registered as "Alojamento Local", meaning they have the license to be rented on platforms such as Booking.com or Airbnb.

In the parish there were no records of homeless people. The parish is nonetheless actively promoting initiatives aiming at helping people in situation of permanent of temporal homelessness.

== Landmarks ==
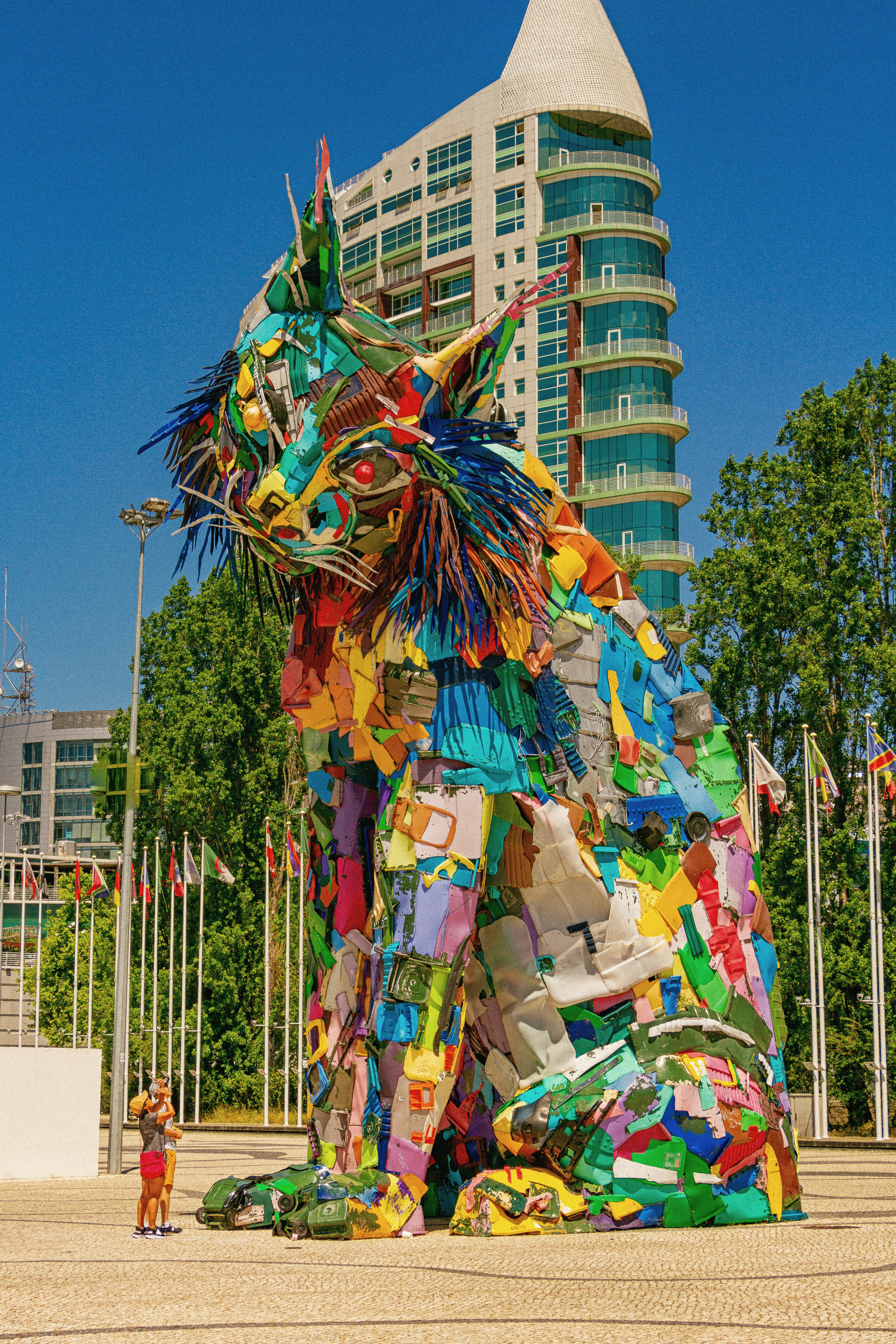
Iberian lynx (2019) by Bordallo II

Portuguese street artist Bordalo II creates installations made of garbage to highlight over-consumption. His works consisting of animals are created to highlight the destruction of species by waste caused by humans. One of his public sculptures is a huge Iberian lynx in the Parque das Nações, made for the World Conference of Ministers Responsible for Youth in 2019 and Youth Forum Lisboa+21.

Other landmarks in the neighbourhood include:

- Lisbon Oceanarium
- Casino Lisboa
- Altice Arena
- Gare do Oriente
- Vasco da Gama Tower
- Vasco da Gama Mall
- Portugal Pavilion

== Headquarters and Branches of the Parish Council (Junta de Freguesia) ==
- Headquarters – Alameda dos Oceanos, 37-B
- Delegação Poente – Rua Padre Joaquim Alves Correia, Lote 23 A/B/C

== Streets ==
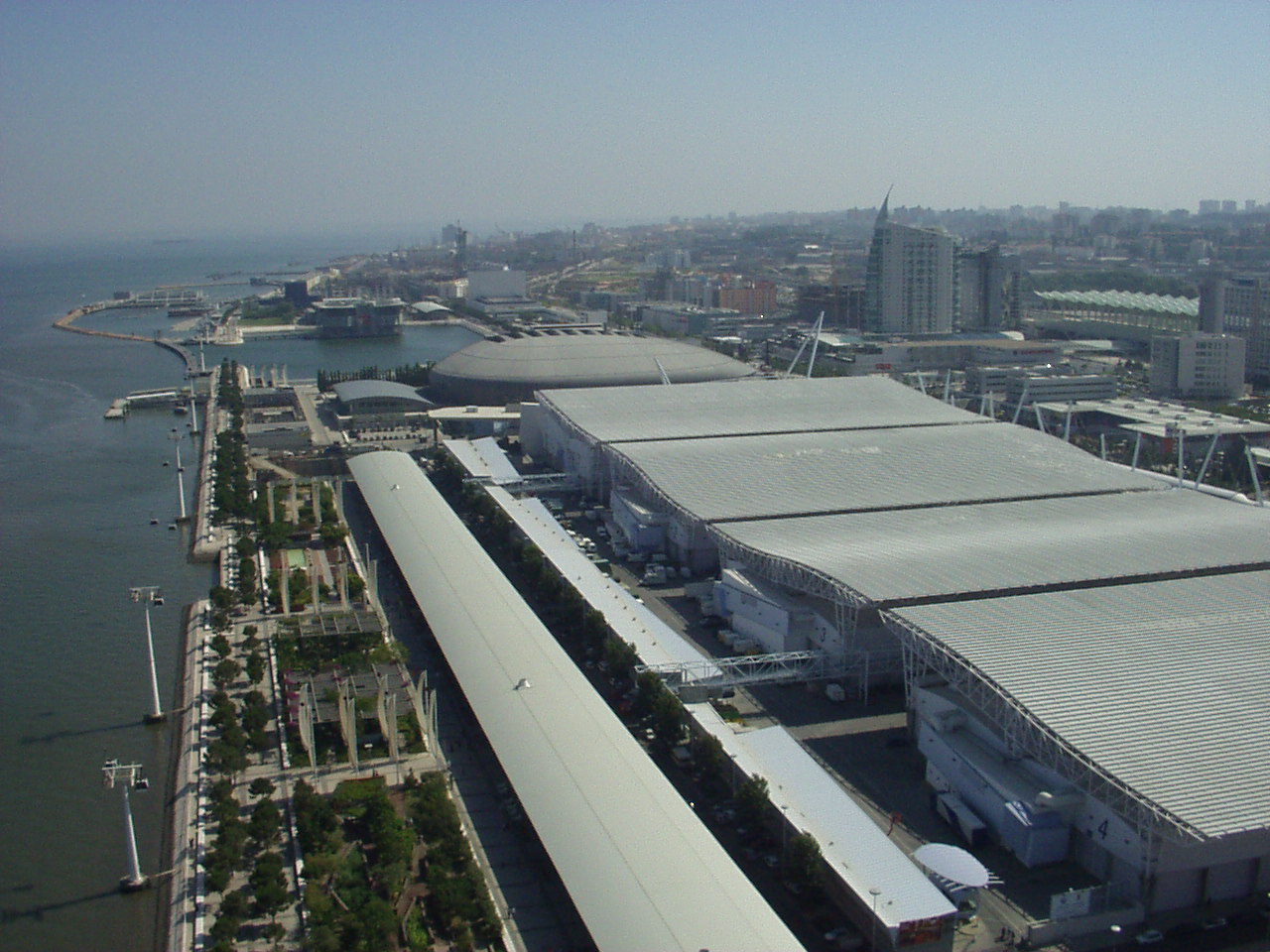
Overall view of Parque das Nações

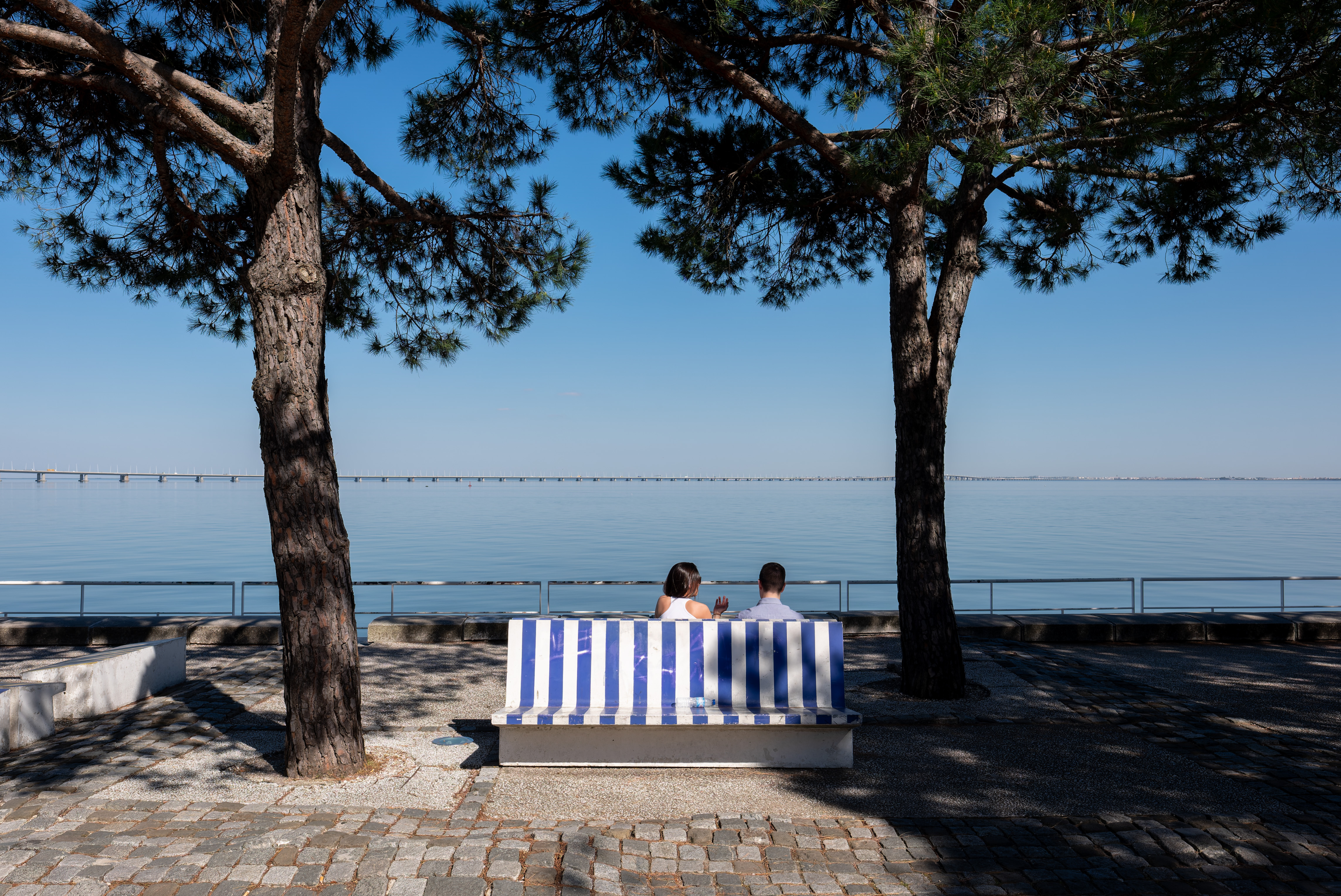
Bancos coloridos by Carrilho da Graça

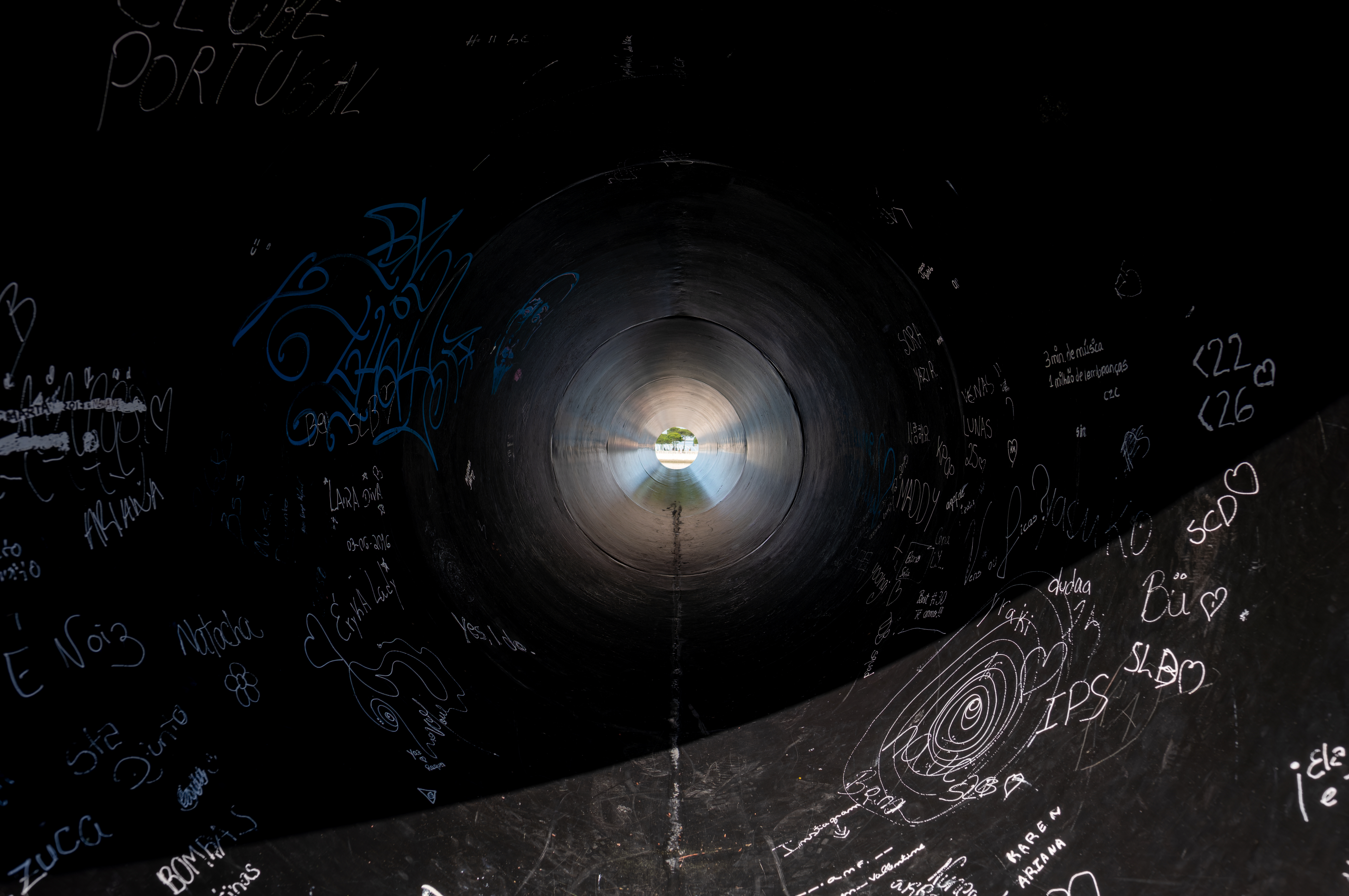
"Horas de Chumbo", by Rui Chafes

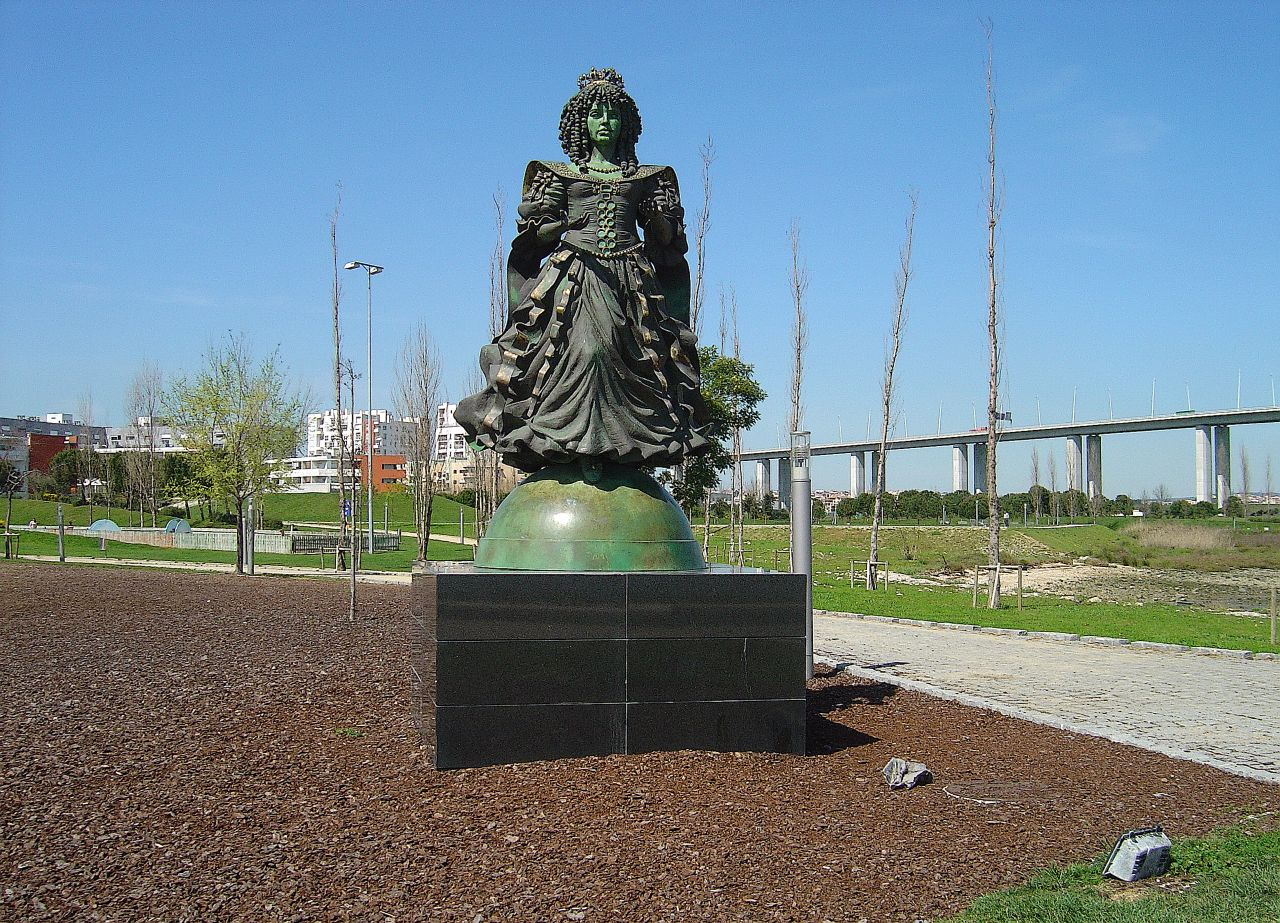
Catarina de Bragança by Audrey Flack

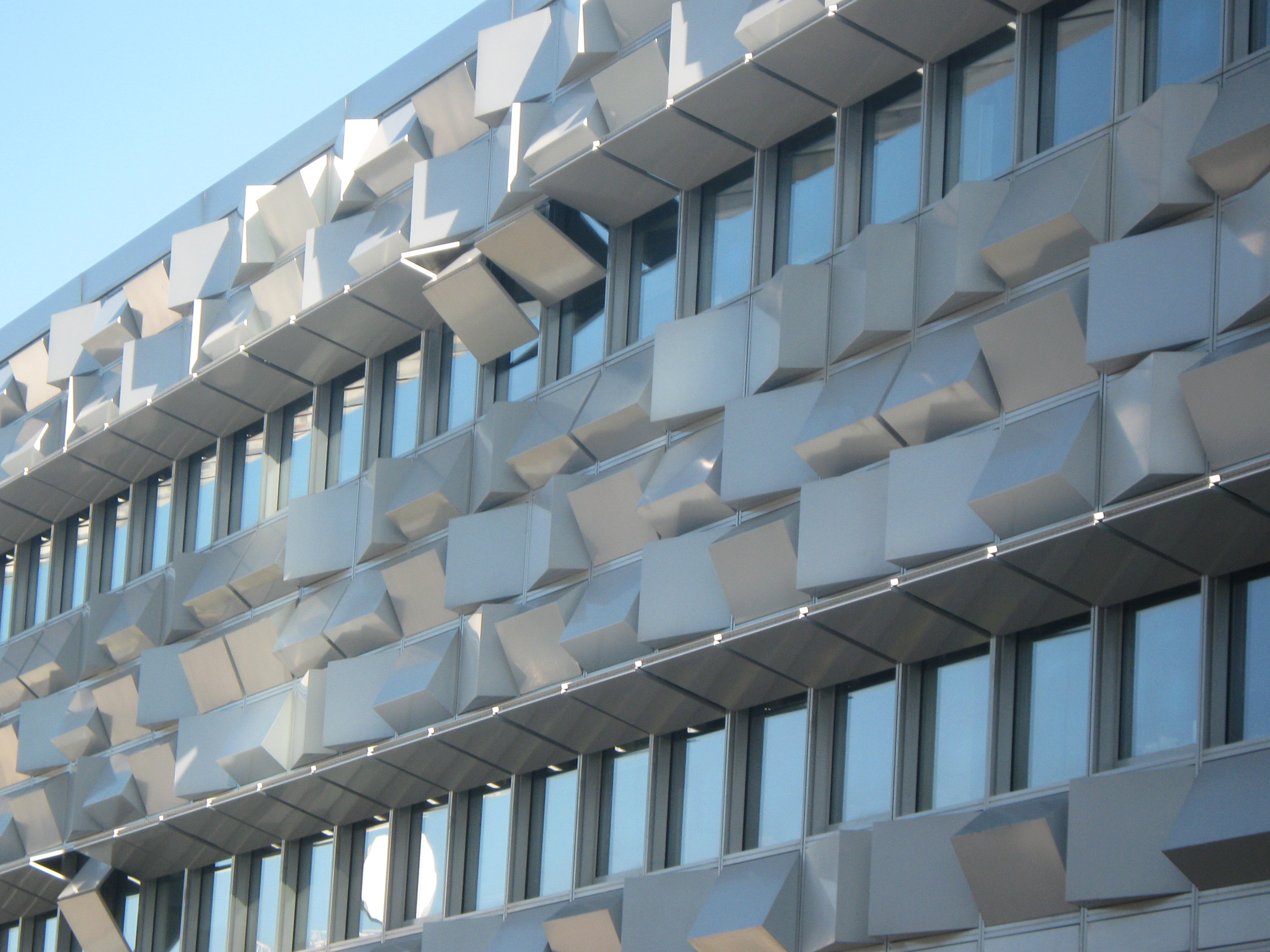
Parque das Nações architecture

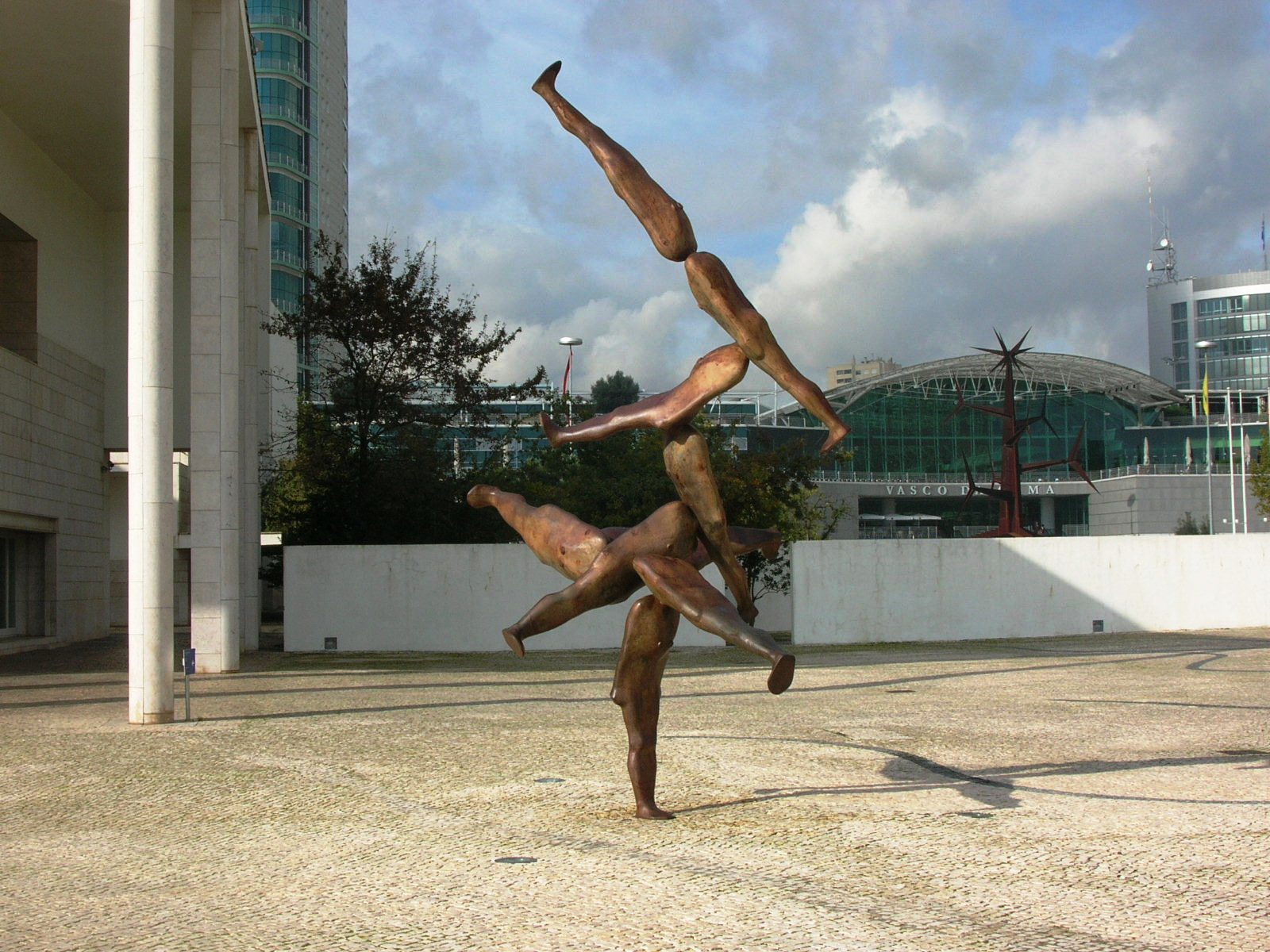
Rizoma by Antony Gormley

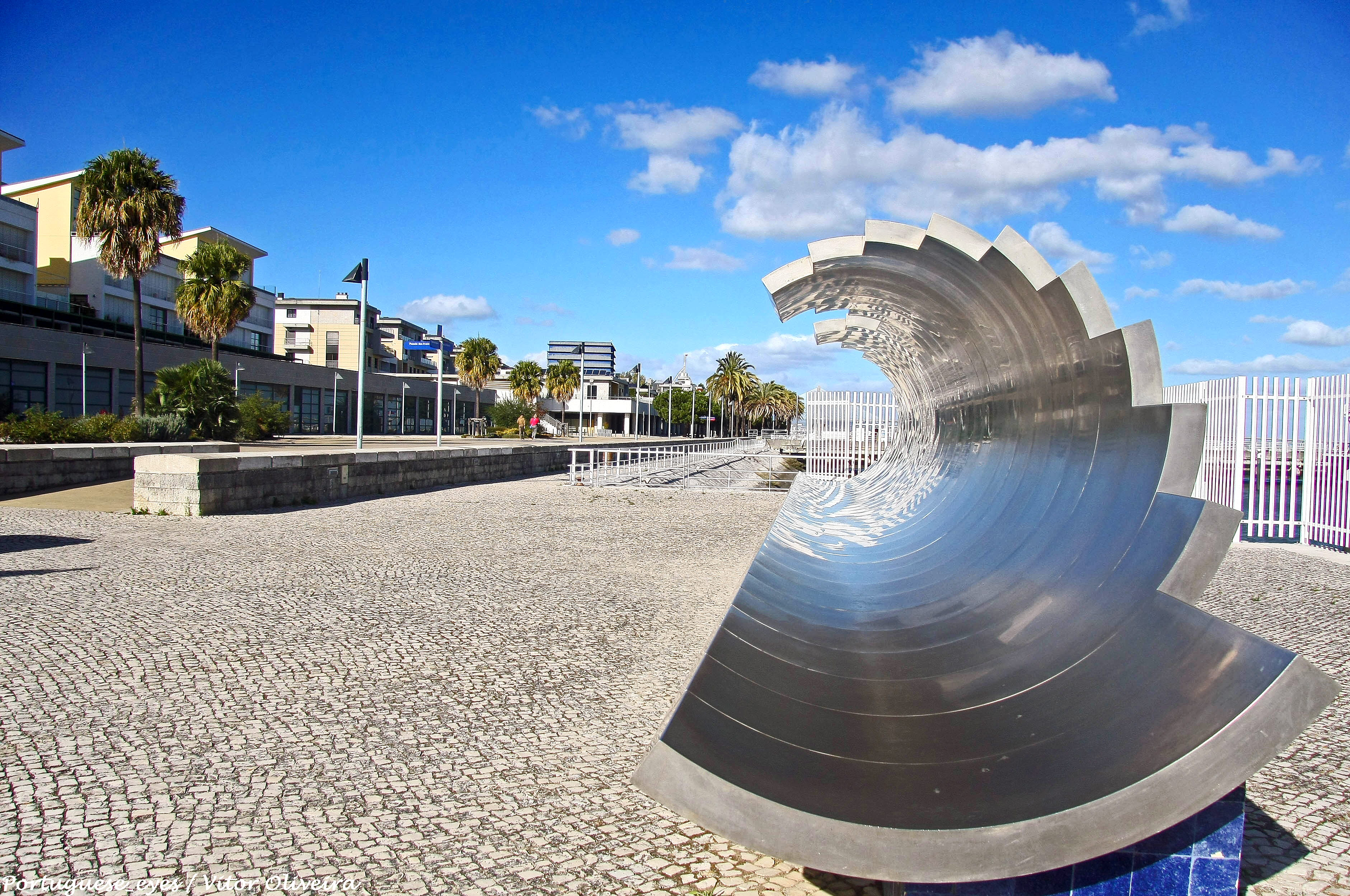
Onda Luso-Americana by Stephen Frietch e Steven Spurlock

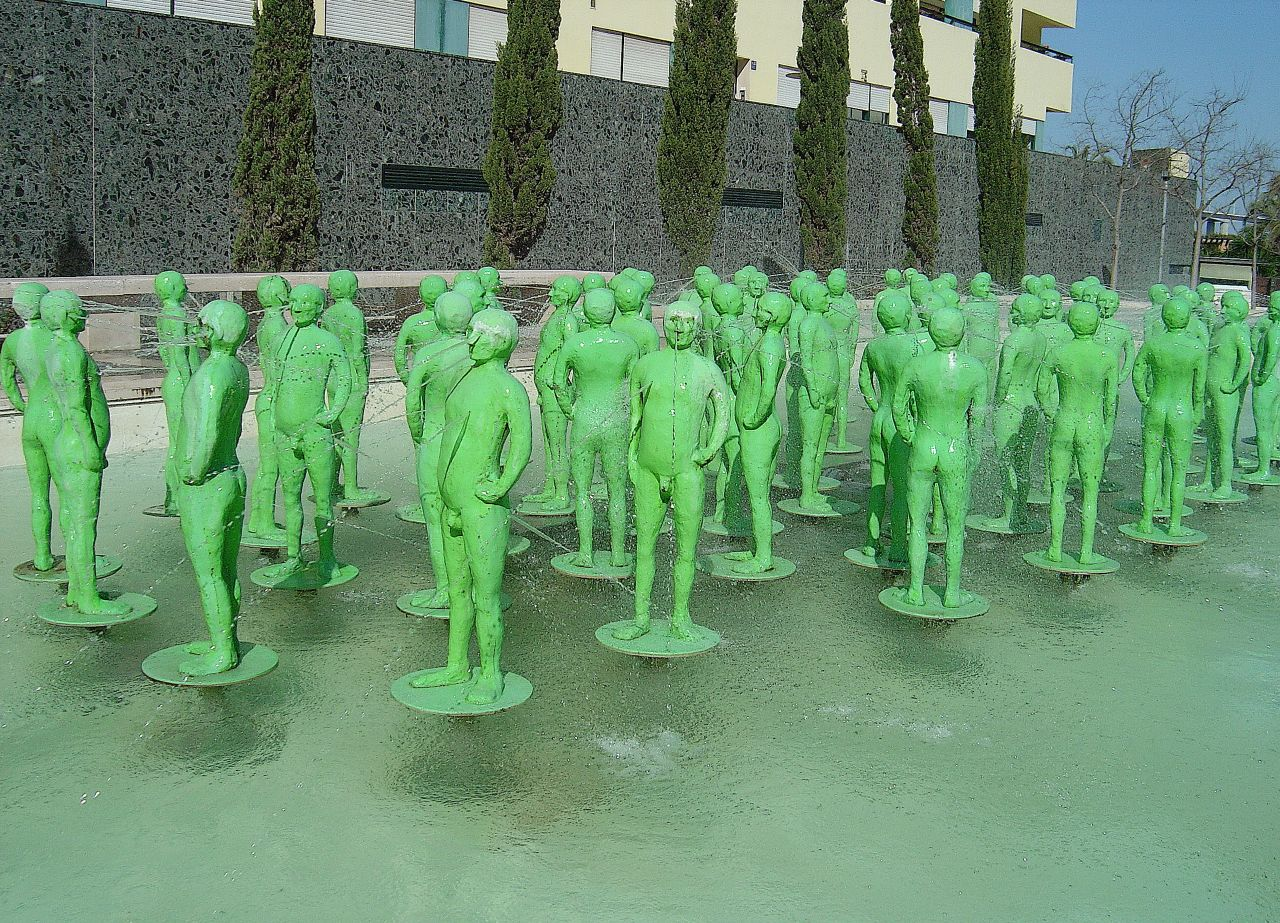
69 Homens de Bessines

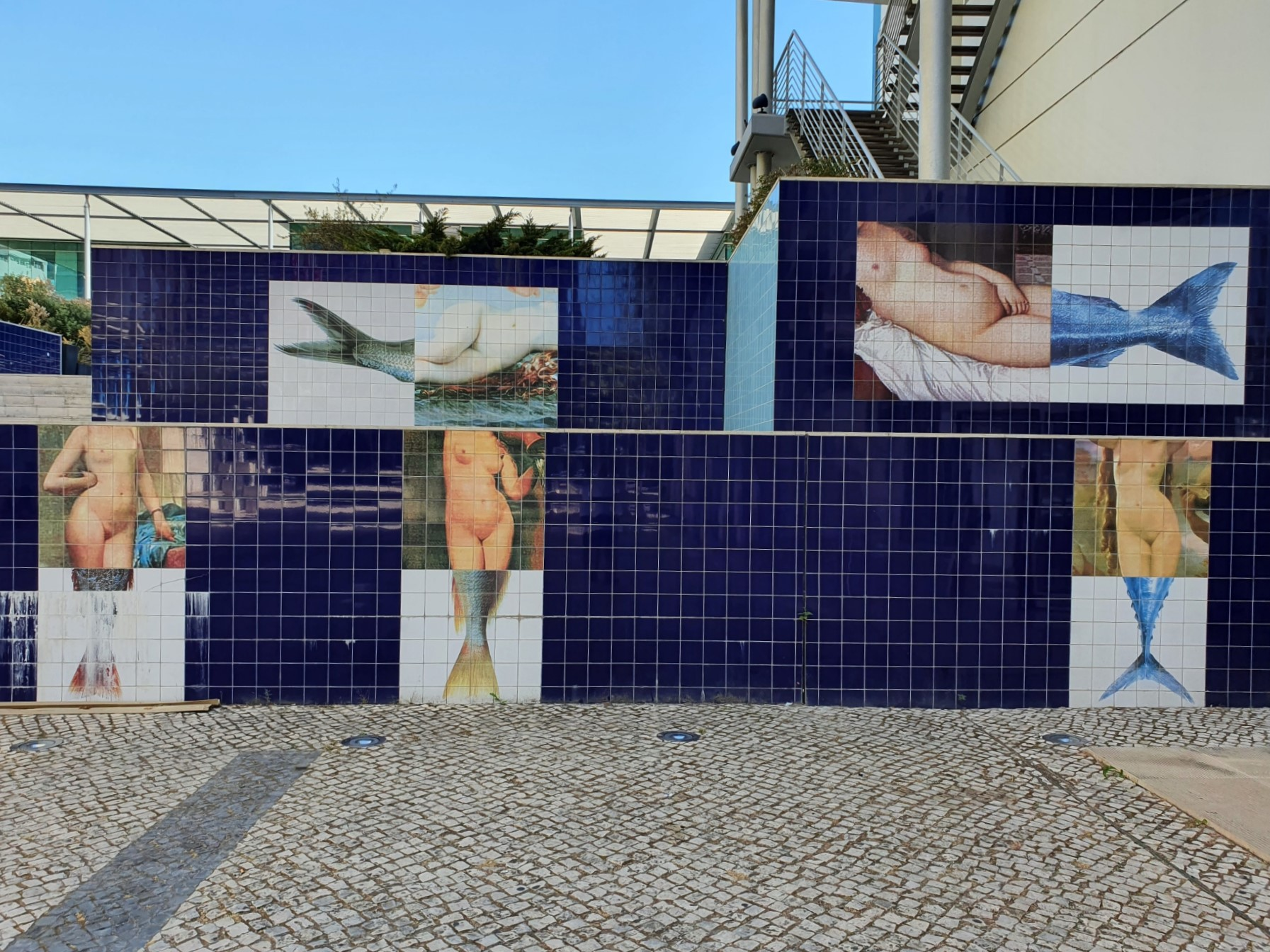
Mermaids by Leonel de Moura

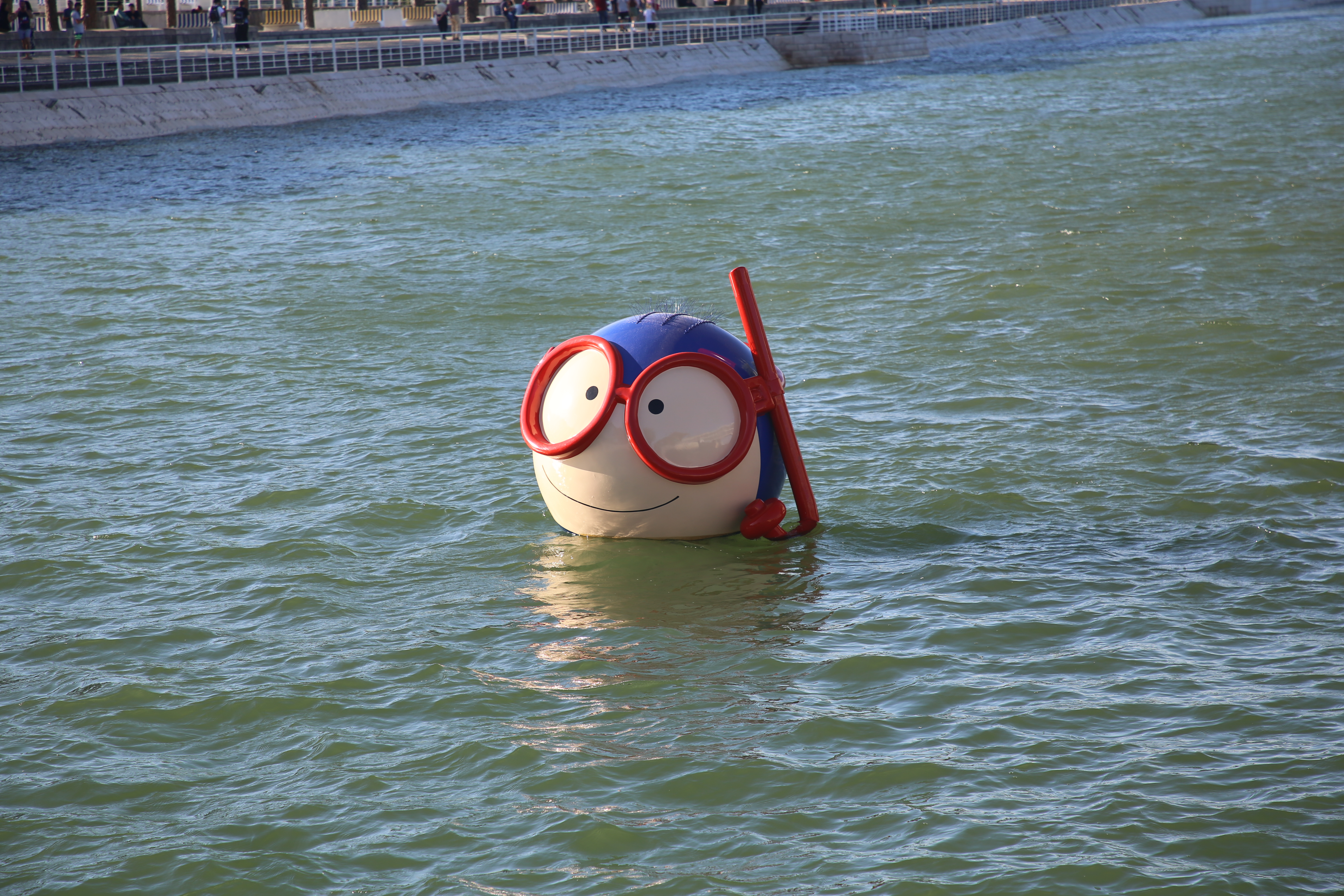
Parque's marina

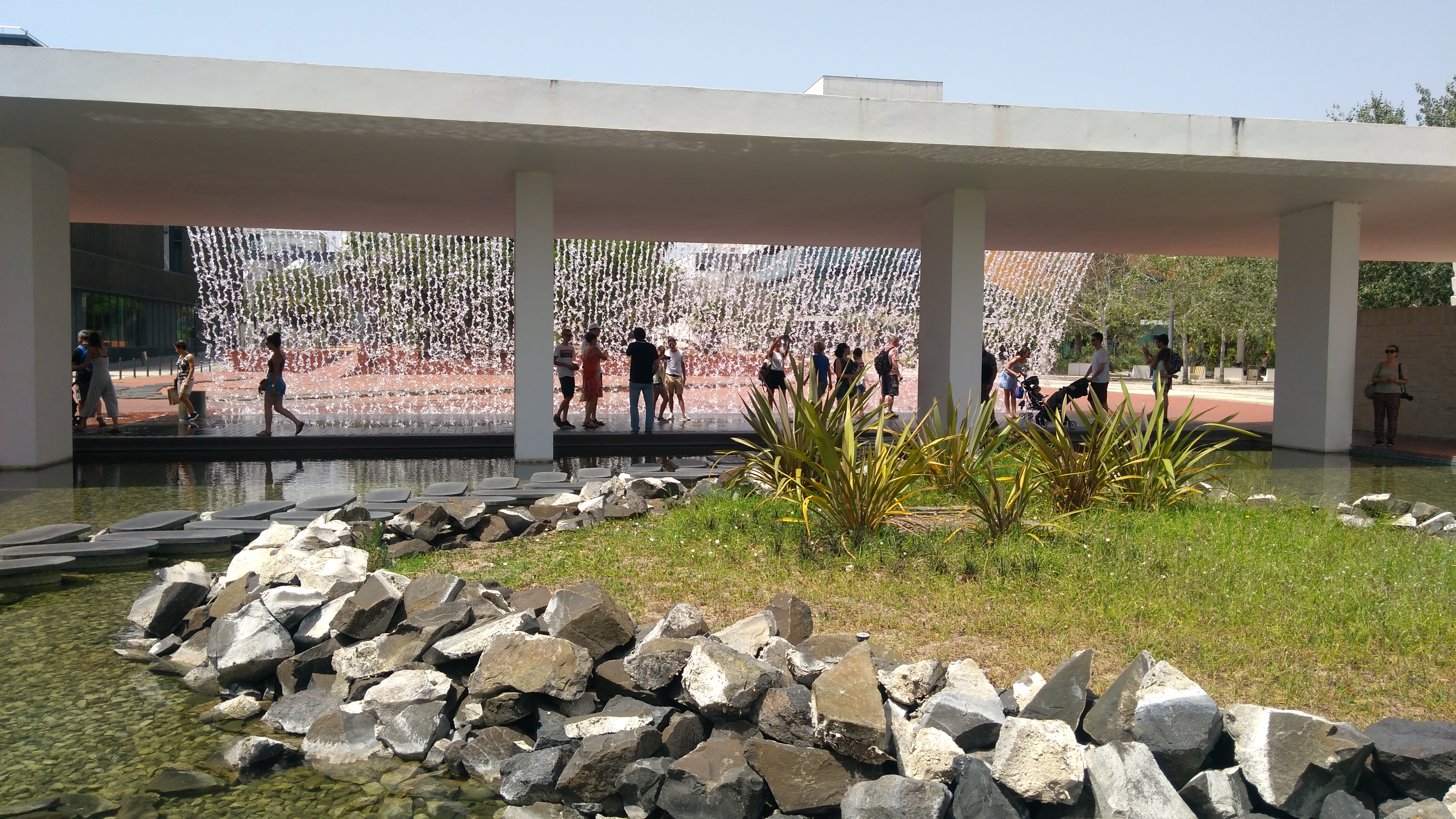
Parque das Nações streetview

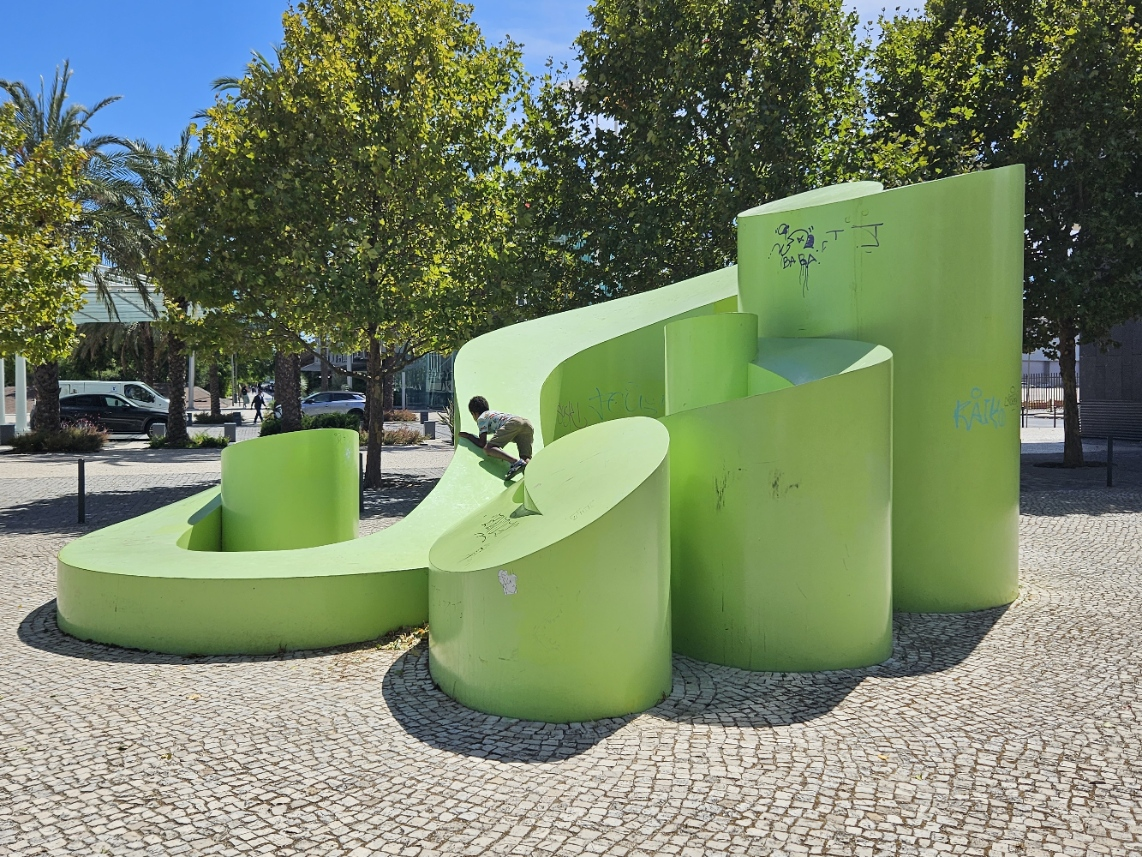
Public art in Parque das Nações

The parish has 204 streets administered by the city council. They are:

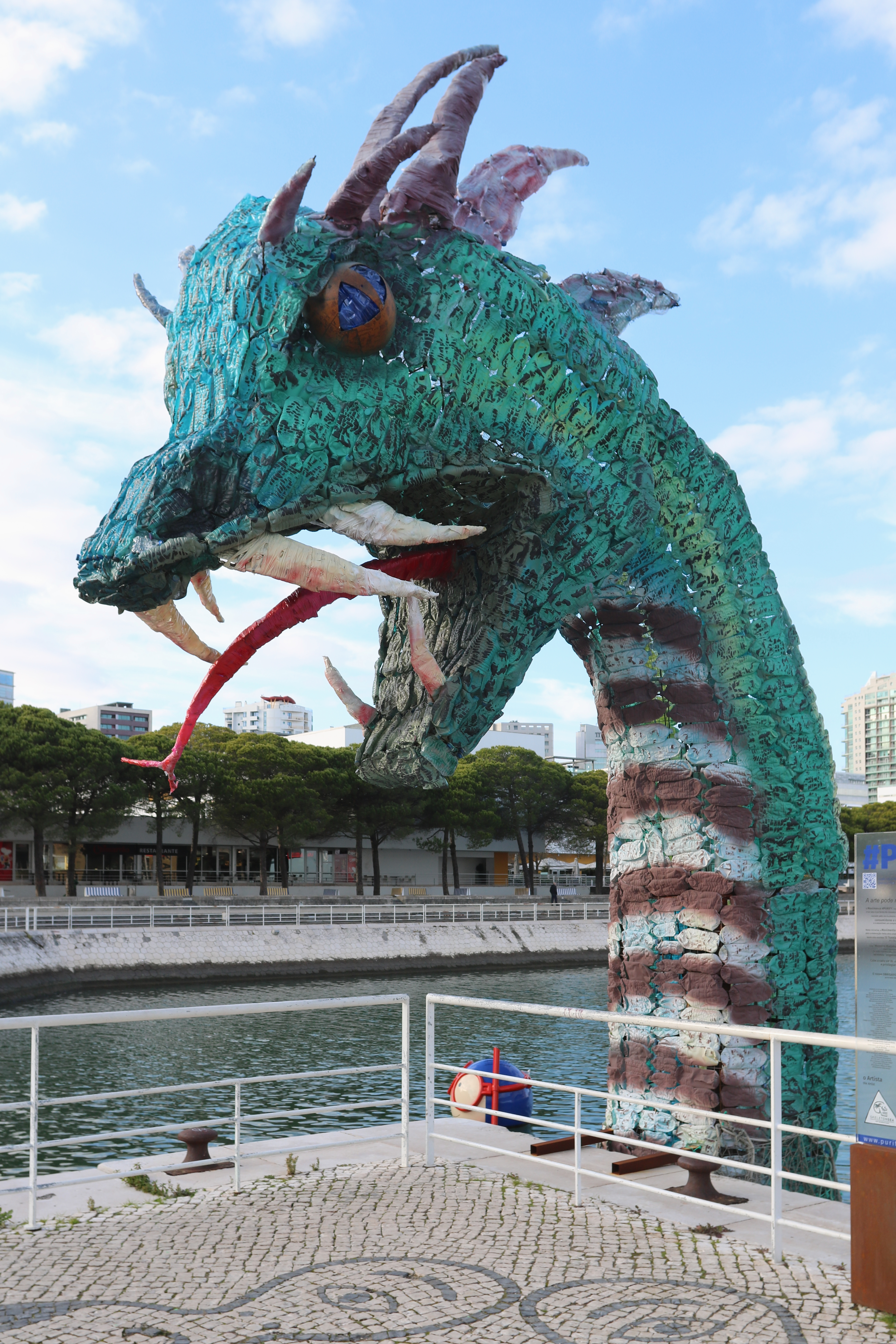
Doca dos Olivais

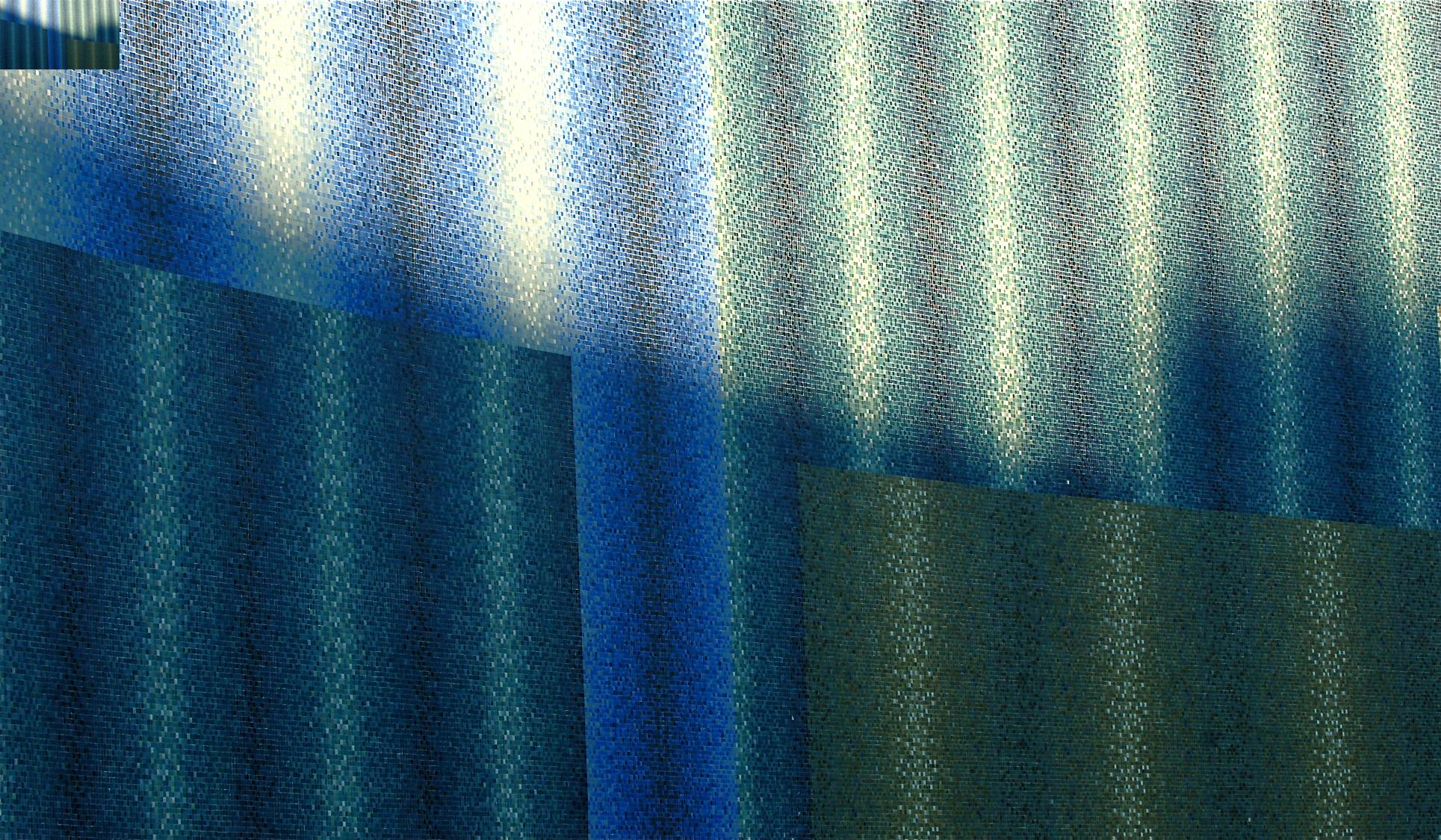
Modern Portuguese tiles

- Alameda dos Oceanos
- Avenida Aquilino Ribeiro Machado
- Avenida D. João II
- Avenida da Boa Esperança
- Avenida da Peregrinação
- Avenida de Berlim
- Avenida de Pádua
- Avenida de Ulisses
- Avenida do Atlântico
- Avenida do Índico
- Avenida do Mediterrâneo
- Avenida do Pacífico
- Avenida Fernando Pessoa ao Parque das Nações
- Avenida Infante Dom Henrique
- Avenida Marechal Gomes da Costa
- Cabeço das Rolas
- Cais das Naus
- Cais do Olival
- Cais dos Argonautas
- Cais Português
- Caminho da Rainha
- Caminho das Andorinhas
- Caminho das Cegonhas
- Caminho das Gaivotas ao Parque das Nações
- Caminho do Arboreto
- Caminho dos Estorninhos
- Caminho dos Flamingos
- Caminho dos Melros
- Caminho dos Pardais
- Caminho dos Pinheiros ao Parque das Nações
- Caminho dos Rouxinóis
- Esplanada D. Carlos I ao Parque das Nações
- Estacada das Gaivotas ao Parque das Nações
- Estacada do Arboreto
- Estrada de Moscavide
- Jardim dos Jacarandás
- Jardim Garcia de Orta ao Parque das Nações
- Jardim Mário Ruivo
- Jardins Ribeirinhos
- Largo Bartolomeu Dias ao Parque das Nações
- Largo Calderon Dinis
- Largo das Bicas
- Largo do Nautilus
- Largo dos Arautos
- Largo José Mariano Gago
- Largo Maria Judite de Carvalho
- Largo Ramada Curto
- Passeio da Ilha dos Amores
- Passeio da Nau Catrineta
- Passeio da Vila Expo
- Passeio das Âncoras
- Passeio das Fragatas
- Passeio das Garças
- Passeio das Gáveas ao Parque das Nações
- Passeio das Musas
- Passeio das Tágides
- Passeio de Neptuno
- Passeio de Ulisses
- Passeio do Adamastor
- Passeio do Amazonas
- Passeio do Báltico
- Passeio do Campo da Bola
- Passeio do Cantábrico
- Passeio do Levante
- Passeio do Parque
- Passeio do Ródano
- Passeio do Sapal
- Passeio do Tejo
- Passeio do Trancão
- Passeio dos Argonautas
- Passeio dos Aventureiros
- Passeio dos Cruzados
- Passeio dos Fenícios
- Passeio dos Heróis do Mar
- Passeio dos Jacarandás
- Passeio dos Mastros
- Passeio dos Navegadores
- Passeio Júlio Verne
- Pátio das Fragatas
- Pátio das Galeotas ao Parque das Nações
- Pátio das Pirogas
- Pátio do Sextante
- Pátio dos Escaleres ao Parque das Nações
- Porta do Mar
- Porta do Tejo
- Praça do Oriente
- Praça do Tejo
- Praça do Venturoso
- Praça Gago Coutinho ao Parque das Nações
- Praça José Queirós
- Praça Mar da Palha
- Praça Príncipe Perfeito
- Praceta Adolfo Ayala
- Rossio do Levante
- Rossio dos Olivais
- Rotunda da Expo 98
- Rotunda das Oliveiras
- Rotunda do Parque
- Rotunda dos Vice-Reis
- Rotunda República Argentina
- Rotunda República da Colômbia
- Rua Alfredo Portela Santos
- Rua António Mega Ferreira
- Rua António Variações
- Rua Câmara Reis
- Rua Capitão Cook
- Rua Carlos Daniel
- Rua Carlos Paião
- Rua Chen He
- Rua Comandante Cousteau
- Rua Corsário das Ilhas
- Rua da Balestilha
- Rua da Centieira
- Rua da Cotovia
- Rua da Ilha dos Amores
- Rua da Nau Catrineta
- Rua da Pimenta
- Rua das Bússolas
- Rua das Caravelas
- Rua das Galés
- Rua das Musas
- Rua das Urcas
- Rua das Velas
- Rua das Vigias
- Rua de Moscavide ao Parque das Nações
- Rua do Adeus Português
- Rua do Bojador
- Rua do Cais das Naus
- Rua do Caribe
- Rua do Congo
- Rua do Conselheiro Lopo Vaz
- Rua do Danúbio
- Rua do Ebro
- Rua do Eufrates
- Rua do Fogo de Santelmo
- Rua do Ganges
- Rua do Indo
- Rua do Kuanza
- Rua do Leme
- Rua do Mar da China
- Rua do Mar do Norte
- Rua do Mar Vermelho
- Rua do Nilo
- Rua do Oder
- Rua do Pólo Norte
- Rua do Pólo Sul
- Rua do Príncipe do Mónaco
- Rua do Professor Picard
- Rua do Reno
- Rua do Rio da Prata
- Rua do Rio das Pérolas
- Rua do Sena
- Rua do Tamisa
- Rua do Tibre
- Rua do Vale Formoso
- Rua do Volga
- Rua do Zambeze
- Rua dos Argonautas
- Rua dos Aventureiros
- Rua dos Cruzados
- Rua Dr. Rui Gomes de Oliveira
- Rua Dra. Sara Benoliel
- Rua Fernando Bento
- Rua Finisterra
- Rua Gaivotas em Terra
- Rua Gonçalo Mendes da Maia
- Rua Henrique Medina
- Rua Jaime Mendes
- Rua Jangada de Pedra
- Rua João Pedro Grácio
- Rua João Pinto Ribeiro
- Rua José Campas
- Rua José Sarmento de Matos
- Rua Manuel Mendes
- Rua Mário Botas ao Parque das Nações
- Rua Mário Viegas
- Rua Menina do Mar
- Rua Nova dos Mercadores
- Rua Padre Abel Varzim
- Rua Padre Joaquim Alves Correia
- Rua Palhaço Luciano
- Rua Pedro e Inês
- Rua Roald Amundsen
- Rua Sinais de Fogo
- Rua Vasco da Gama Rodrigues
- Rua Vitorino Magalhães Godinho
- Terreiro das Ondas
- Terreiro dos Corvos ao Parque das Nações
- Travessa Corto Maltese
- Travessa da Canela
- Travessa da Malagueta
- Travessa das Corujas
- Travessa de Beirolas
- Travessa do Açafrão
- Travessa do Gengibre
- Travessa do Gil
- Travessa do Gulliver
- Travessa do Poço
- Travessa dos Mochos
- Travessa dos Pintassilgos
- Travessa Robinson Crusoé
- Travessa Sandokan
- Travessa Sinbad, o Marinheiro
- Via do Oriente
