= João Luís Carrilho da Graça =

Portuguese architect (born 1952)

- Born: 22 November 1952 (age 73); Portalegre, Portugal
- Occupation: Architect
- Practice: JLCG Arquitectos
- Buildings: Theatre and Auditorium, Poitiers; Knowledge of the Seas Pavilion, Lisbon
- Projects: Maison de la Paix, Genève

João Luís Carrilho da Graça (born 1952, in Portalegre, Portugal) is a Portuguese architect and lecturer. He received the Pessoa Prize in 2008, and was Distinguished with the order for merit of the Portuguese Republic in 1999.

== Career ==
Graca graduated from the Lisbon School of Fine Arts (Portuguese: Escola Superior de Belas Artes de Lisboa) in 1977 and lectured at the Faculty of Architecture of the Technical University of Lisbon between 1977 and 1992. Since 2001, he has been a guest lecturer at the architecture department of the Autonomous University of Lisbon and also, from 2005, at the University of Évora. He has been invited to several universities, seminars and conferences all over the world.

Carrilho da Graça received the International Art Critics Association Award in 1992 for the ensemble of his work; the "Relação com o sítio - honourable mention" award (national architecture awards - Portuguese architects’ association) in 1993 for the Campo Maior municipal swimming pool; the Secil Prize 1994 for the Polytechnic School of Journalism, the Valmor prize 1998 and the Fad Prize 1999 for the Knowledge of the Seas pavilion; Luzboa 2004, the prize of the first Lisbon international art biennial; as well as nominations for the Mies van der Rohe European architecture award and the Ordem dos Arquitectos for the Auguste Perret Prize, UIA Awards 2005.

His work has been published in several books and architecture magazines.
