= List of works by Álvaro Siza Vieira =

Piscinas de Marés at Leça da Palmeira, 1959-1973

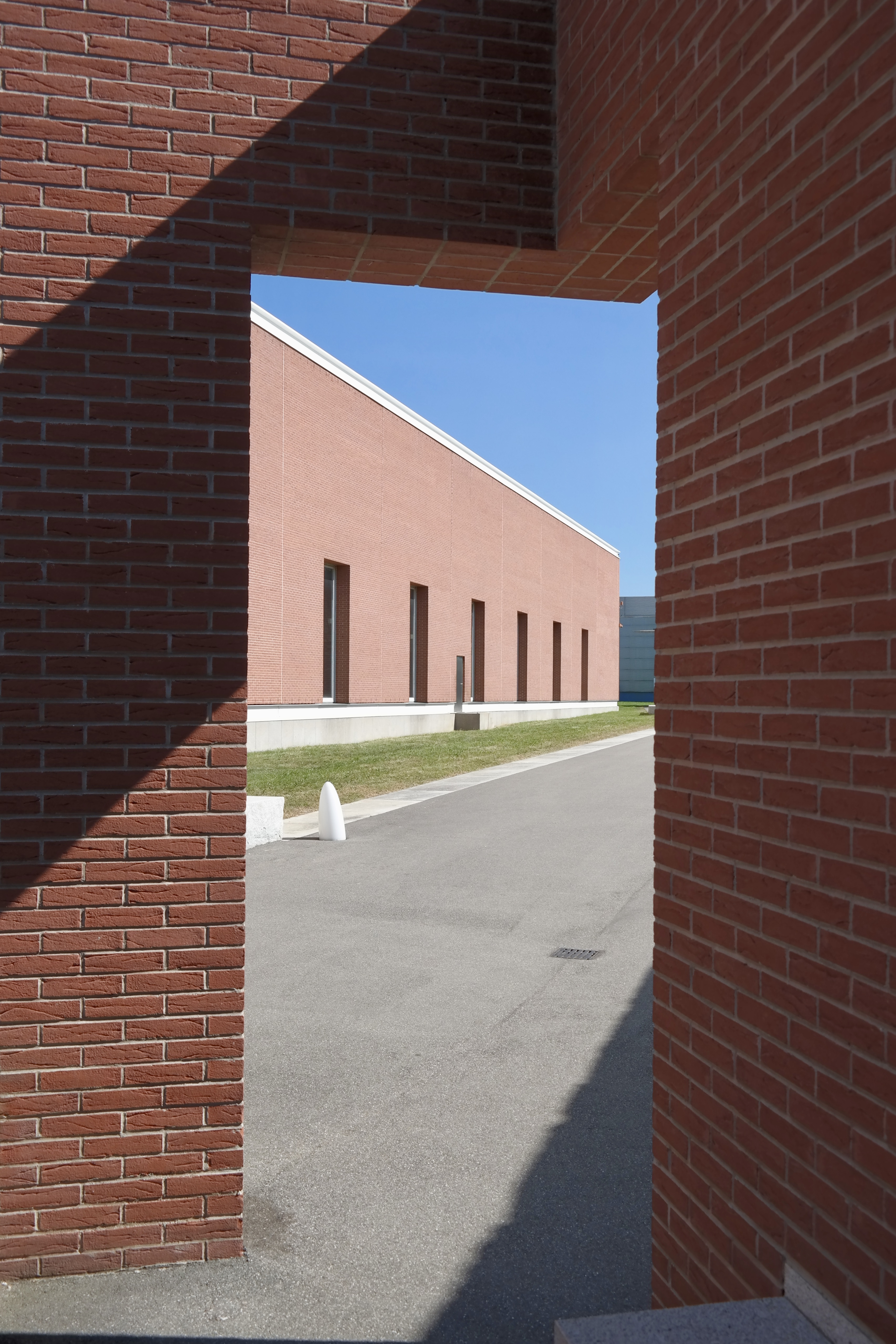
Vitra factory, 1994

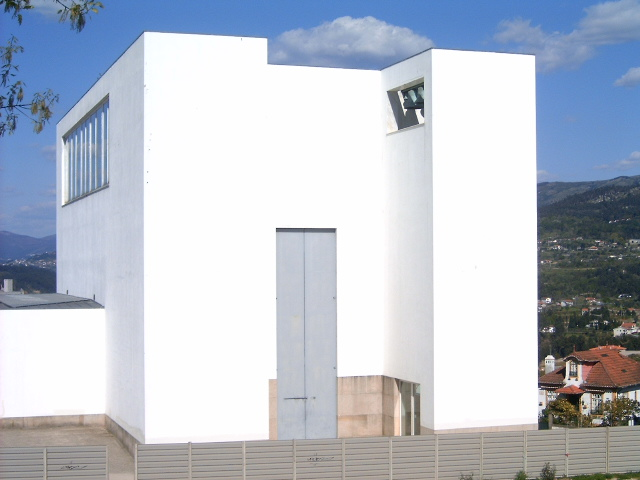
Marco de Canavezes Church, 1990-1996

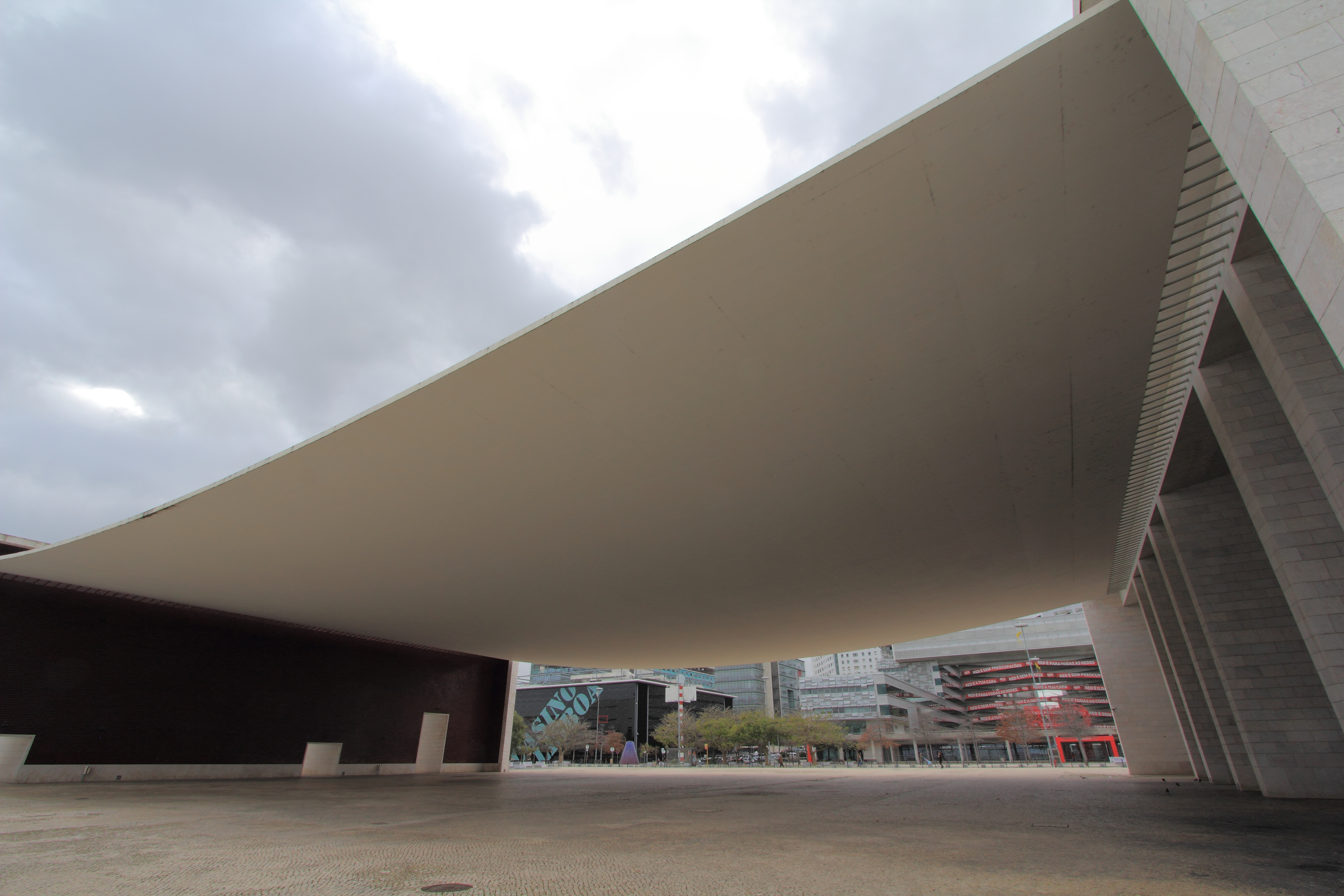
Expo'98 pavilion of Portugal with its concrete veil, 1998

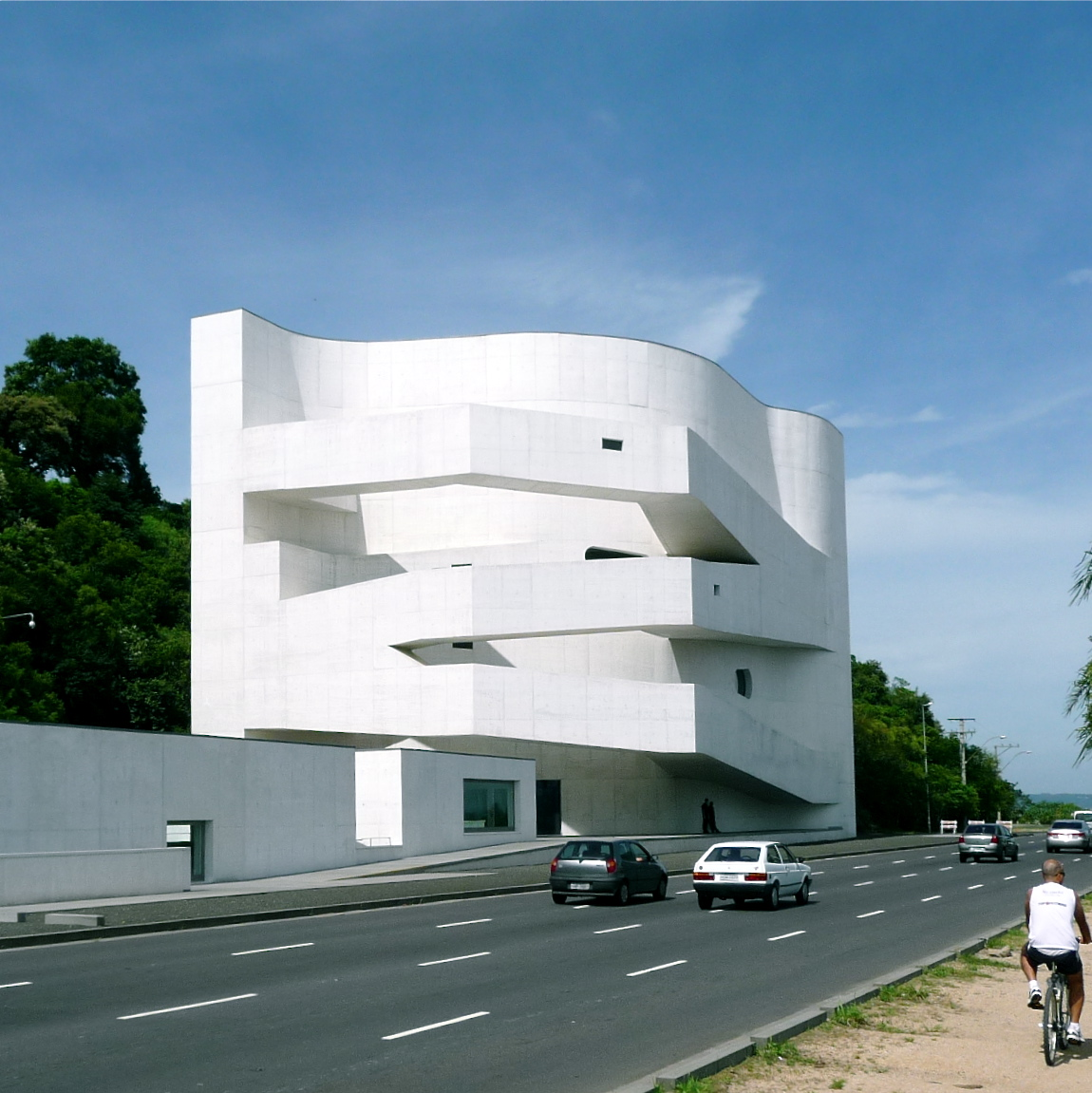
Ibere Camargo Foundation, 2008

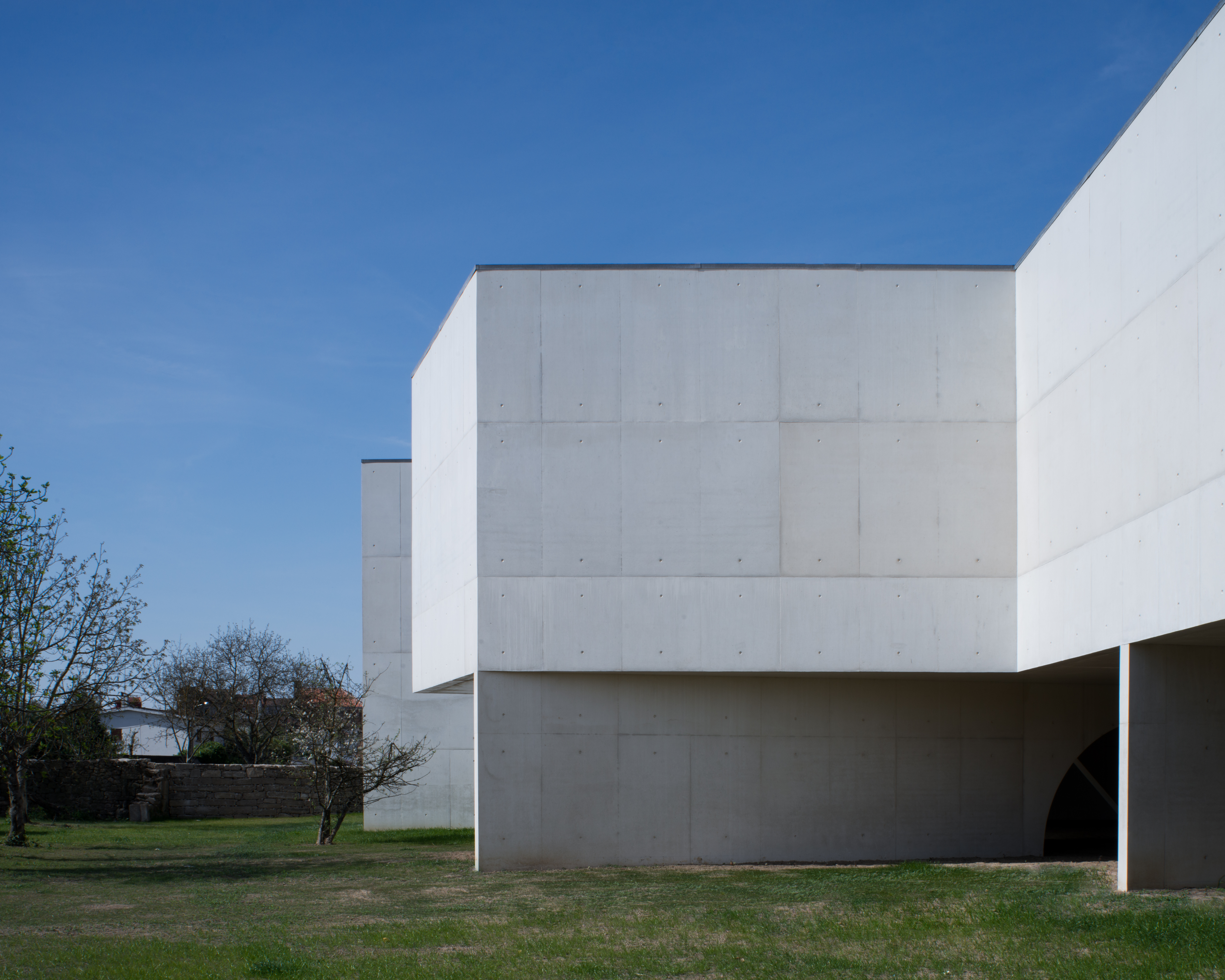
Museu Nadir Afonso, 2016

This list of works by Álvaro Siza Vieira categorizes the Pritzker Prize winning architect's work.

- 1958-1963: Boa Nova Tea House in Leça da Palmeira, Portugal. (Photos)
- 1958-1965: Quinta de Conceição swimming-pool, Portugal. (Photos)
- 1959-1973: Piscinas de Marés swimming-pool, Leça da Palmeira, Portugal.
- 1962: Miranda Santos House, Portugal.
- 1964: Beires House ("The Bomb House"), Póvoa de Varzim, Portugal. (Project)
- 1977-1997: Malagueira Social Housing, Évora, Portugal.
- 1980-1984: Bonjour Tristesse, Berlin, Germany.
- 1981-1985: Avelino Duarte House Ovar, Portugal.
- 1984-1994: Casa Vieira de Castro, Vila Nova de Famalicão, Portugal.
- 1985: Campo di Marte Social Housing Project, Venice, Italy.
- 1985-1988: Housing Schilderswijk West, the Hague, Netherlands.
- 1986-1993: Faculty of Architecture of the University of Porto, Portugal.
- 1986: Borges&Irmão Bank, Vila do Conde, Portugal.
- 1988: Rebuilding plans of the Chiado neighbourhood after a fire, Lisbon, Portugal.
- 1988-1993: Galician Center of Contemporary Art, Santiago de Compostela, Spain.
- 1990-1996: Church of Santa Maria, Marco de Canaveses, Portugal.
- 1990 Two Houses and Shops in the Van der Vennepark, The Hague, Netherlands
- 1991-1999: Faculty of Journalism, University of Santiago, Santiago de Compostela, Spain.
- 1991-2000: Residential buildings ( "Siza tower"), Maastricht, Netherlands.
- 1992: Barcelona's Meteorology Center, Barcelona, Spain.
- 1992-2021: Headquarters of the Bank of Cape Verde, Praia, Cape Verde
- 1994: Vitra (furniture) factory hall, Weil am Rhein, Germany.
- 1995: Revigrés exhibition and sales hall at Águeda, Portugal.
- 1995: Library of the University of Aveiro, Portugal.
- 1995-2000: School of Journalism, Santiago de Compostela, Spain
- 1995-2003: Van Middelem-Dupont house and gallery (De 11 Lijnen), Oudenburg, Belgium
- 1995-2009: Architecture Museum Insel Hombroich, Neuss, Germany.
- 1997: Serralves Museum of Contemporary Art, Porto, Portugal.
- 1997: Rectory of the University of Alicante, Alicante, Spain.
- 1998: Architectural Practice, Porto, Portugal. (Photos)
- 1998: Lisbon Metro Station Baixa Chiado, Portugal.
- 1998: Pavilion of Portugal in Expo'98, Lisbon, Portugal.
- 1998-2005: General University Hospital of Ciudad Real, Ciudad Real, Spain.
- 2000: Pavilion of Portugal in Expo'00, Hannover, Germany.
- 2002: Southern Municipal District Center, Rosario, Argentina.
- 2005: Serpentine Gallery Pavilion 2005, London, United Kingdom.
- 2005: Porto Metro Station Sao Bento, Porto, Portugal.
- 2005: Llobregat Sports Center, Cornellà de Llobregat, Spain.
- 2005: Donnaregina Modern Art Museum Naples, Italy
- 2005: Tolo House Ribeira de Pena, Portugal
- 2006: Home and Atelier of Armanda Passos, Porto, Portugal.
- 2007: Adega Mayor wine seller, Campo Maior, Portugal.
- 2007-2010: Mimesis Museum in Paju Book City, Seoul, South Korea.
- 2008: Iberê Camargo Foundation, Porto Alegre, Brazil.
- 2009: New Orleans residential tower, Rotterdam, Netherlands.
- 2009-2019: University Hospital of Toledo, Toledo, Spain.
- 2009-2021 Miljana Chapel, Hrvatsko Zagorje, Croatia.
- 2011: Bizkaia Aretoa main hall of the University of the Basque Country, Bilbao, Spain.
- 2011-2012: "Alvaro Siza. Viagem sem Programa" Art work collection of his sketches and drawings. Museum Fondazione Querini Stampalia, Venice, Italy
- 2012: Novartis Campus Office Building, Basel, Switzerland.
- 2012: Terraces of Braganza residential complex, Lisbon, Portugal.
- 2012: "Il Giardino delle Vergini" Pavilion Giardini della Biennale, Venice Biennale of Architecture, Italy.
- 2014: Office building for the Shihlien Chemical Industrial Jiangsu Co, Jiangsu, China.
- 2014: Siza House-Taifong Golf Club, Taiwan.
- 2015: Auditorium Theatre of Llinars del Valles, Llinars del Vallès, Barcelona, Spain.
- 2015-2017: Church of Saint-Jacques-de-la-Lande, France.
- 2016: Museu Nadir Afonso, Chaves, Portugal.
- 2017: Abade Pedrosa Museum, Santo Tirso, Portugal.
- 2018: Saya Park Art Pavilion, Gyeongsangbuk-do, South Korea.
- 2018: Capela do Monte, Bensafrim e Barão de São João, Portugal.
- 2019: Amore Pacific Campus, Yogin-sin, South Korea.
- 2019: China Design Museum, Hangzhou, China.
- 2019-2022: 611 West 56th Street Residential Tower Manhattan, New York City, United States of America.
- 2020: Residential complex, Gallarate, Varese, Italy.
- 2020: Huamao Museum of Art Education, Yinzhou, China.
- 2021: Gramaxo Foundation, Maia, Portugal.
- 2022: Jeju Island Tea House, Jeju, South Korea.
- 2023: Serralves Museum of Contemporary Art Extension, Porto, Portugal.
- 2023: Colien House Barcelona, Spain
- 2024: Miradouro do Zebro, Oleiros, Portugal
- 2024: Monastery of Leça do Balio, Matosinhos, Portugal
- 2024: Dongqian Lake Club House, Ningbo, China
