= Bonjour Tristesse (disambiguation) =

Bonjour Tristesse is a 1954 novel by Françoise Sagan.

Bonjour Tristesse may also refer to:

- Bonjour Tristesse (1958 film), by Otto Preminger
- Bonjour Tristesse (2024 film), by Durga Chew-Bose
- Bonjour Tristesse (building), a building in Berlin, Germany
