= Maria Antónia Siza =

Portuguese artist

- Born: Maria Antónia Marinho Leite; 25 May 1940; Porto, Portugal
- Died: 11 January 1973 (aged 32); Porto, Portugal
- Known for: Painting, drawing,
- Movement: Figurativism
- Spouse: Álvaro Siza Vieira

Maria Antónia Siza (25 May 1940 – 11 January 1973) was a Portuguese artist who left an estate with more than 3,000 works, including drawings, gouache paintings, and embroidery, but only exhibited once before her early death. She came to public attention when part of her estate was donated by her husband to the Calouste Gulbenkian Museum in Lisbon.

== Early life ==
Maria Antónia Marinho Leite Siza was born on 25 May 1940 in Porto. She came from an affluent, conservative, and religious family. Her father, Alberto Leite, was an office worker, art lover and painter in his spare time, while her mother, Maria Luísa Marinho, was the daughter of the owner of a textile company. Siza attended Catholic schools in the Porto area before enrolling in the Escola Superior de Belas-Artes do Porto (School of Fine Arts of Porto) at the age of 17. At the school she became friendly with artists such as Ângelo de Sousa, Jorge Pinheiro and Armando Alves. In 1961, she married the artist and architect Álvaro Siza Vieira, with whom she had two children, the architect Álvaro Leite Siza Vieira and Joana Marinho Leite Siza.

== Artistic career ==
While receiving praise from her teachers, Siza's style did not follow the established consensus and, whilst her contemporaries were mainly producing abstract art, she was not prepared to compromise to achieve wider acceptance. Her style has been described as containing elements of figurativism, expressionism and surrealism and she produced works in gouache, charcoal, India ink, watercolours, oil painting, and embroidery, as well as engravings. Some estimates put her total work at more than 3000 pieces, although others talk of "over one thousand". Despite this considerable output, Siza exhibited only once, at the Cooperativa Árvore in Porto.

== Death ==
Siza died on 11 January 1973. She had been suffering from postpartum depression.

== Subsequent recognition ==
A selection of the works of Siza was published in 2002 by Edições Asa in association with a new exhibition at Cooperativa Árvore in Porto. In 2016, some of her work was exhibited in Zagreb, Croatia alongside that of her husband, in an exhibition entitled Álvaro Siza & Maria Antónia Siza.

Siza's husband and children had been reluctant to exhibit her work because they thought it would be too painful for them. However, her husband decided to donate 141 pieces to the Calouste Gulbenkian Museum and, of these, 36 were exhibited at the museum in 2019. Her work was also included in a 2021 exhibition of Portuguese artists at the same museum, which was part of the cultural programme of the Portuguese Presidency of the Council of the European Union. Her work has also been exhibited in Madrid and Berlin.
