= Casa de Chá da Boa Nova =

Building in Portugal

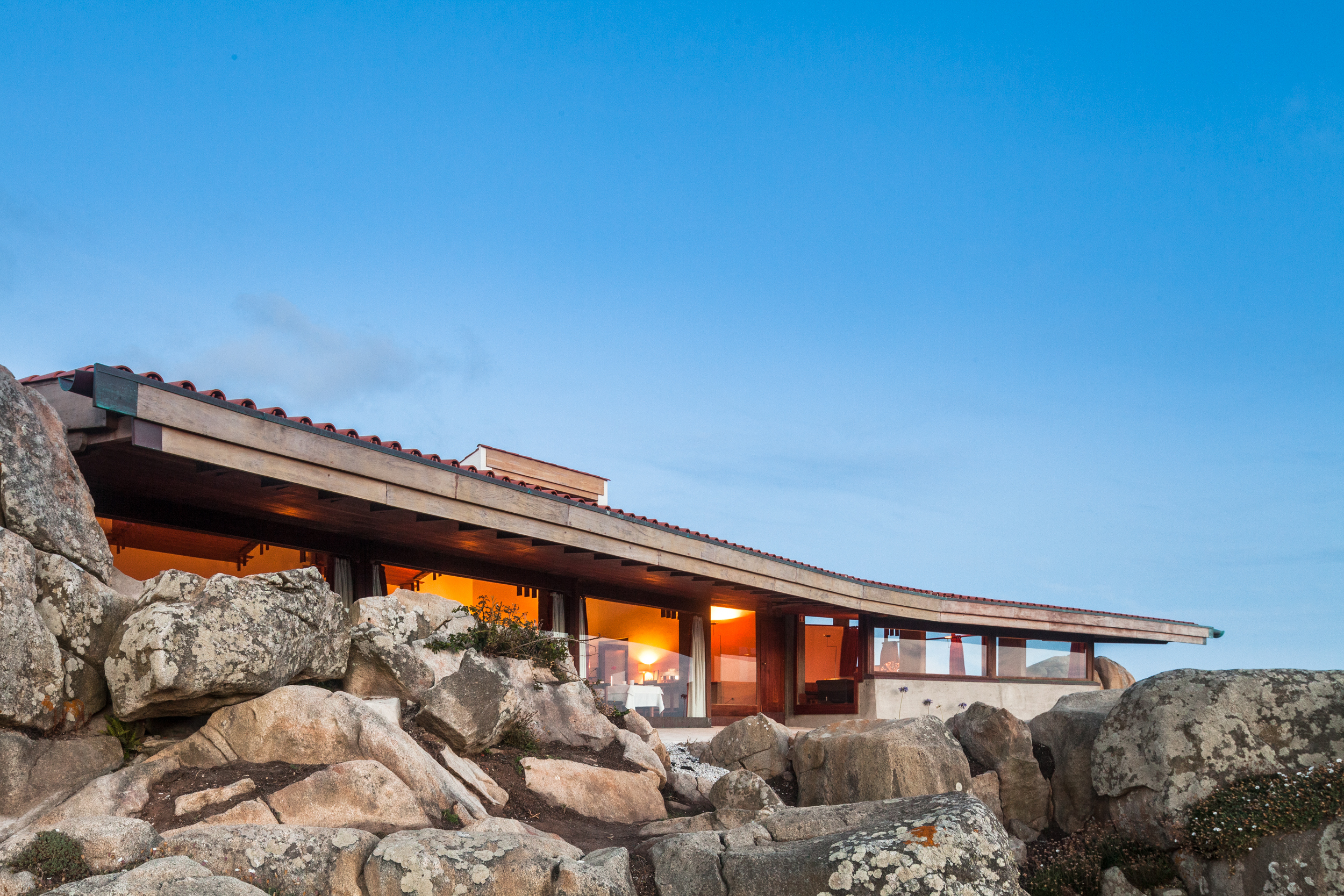

General information
- Architectural style: Modernist
- Coordinates: 41°12′11″N 8°42′54″W
- Opened: 1963
- Owner: Municipality of Matosinhos

Design and construction
- Architect: Álvaro Siza Vieira

Other information
- Parking: Yes
- Public transit: Yes

Casa de Chá da Boa Nova (Boa Nova Tea House) is a restaurant designed by the Portuguese architect Álvaro Siza Vieira. Situated on the Atlantic coast of Portugal, it is in the Leça da Palmeira parish in the municipality of Matosinhos in the Porto District. The building is close to the Tidal pools of Leça da Palmeira designed by the same architect, and the Leça Lighthouse, another local landmark. It has been classified as a national monument since 2011.

== History ==
The building was designed following a competition held by Matosinhos in 1956, which was won by architect Fernando Távora. After choosing the site on the rocks overlooking the sea, Távora handed over the project to one of his juniors, Álvaro Siza, who was taking the first steps in his career. It was one of his first works, implemented between 1958 and 1963.

The building originally functioned as a tea room. It was remodelled in 1991 after a strong storm hit the building. In 2011 it was vacated by the company running it, on the termination of its contract, was allowed to rapidly become run down and was subject to vandalism, despite its classification as a National Monument.

In 2014 the Tea House was reopened as a restaurant. The renovation was carried out under the supervision of Siza, in accordance with the original drawings and specifications. As of mid-2023 the building functioned as a Michelin-starred restaurant. This necessitated a change to the original layout in order to fit more dining tables.

== Description ==
According to Siza, “architects do not invent anything, they transform reality.” Set in an area of rocks, the building is an example of the relation of architecture with an active interpretation of the landscape. The Casa de Chá is accessed from a parking lot, which is about 300 meters away. Access is via a stepped pathway integrated into the rocks, which alternately reveals and hides the sea. On reaching the building, the low eaves of the roof direct the visitor's gaze to the sea. The interior is designed to frame the landscape, utilising large glass panels that blur the boundaries between the building and its surroundings. The presence of wood on the floors, walls and ceilings highlights Siza's admiration for the work of the Finnish architect, Alvar Aalto.

== Gallery ==
View from the landward side

Entrance stairway beside granite boulders

Sea-facing terrace beneath the projecting timber roof

Wooden staircase and upper landing

Main dining room with a sloping timber ceiling and a continuous bench

Rocky coastline framed by the dining room window
