= Aedes Architecture Forum =

Private architecture gallery in Berlin

Coordinates: 52°31′56″N 13°24′39″E

- Architekturforum Aedes
- Established: 1980
- Location: Pfefferberg site, Berlin-Prenzlauer Berg, Germany
- Type: Architecture gallery
- Director: Hans-Jürgen Commerell
- Website: aedes-arc.de

Aedes Architecture Forum is an architecture gallery in Berlin, Germany. Founded in 1980, it became Germany's first private architecture gallery.

== Mission ==
Aedes presents architectural visions, sustainable urban concepts, urban planning, and landscape architecture through exhibitions and publications. Throughout its history, the museum has held more than 350 exhibitions which have showcased the work of prominent architects and future Pritzker Prize laureates such as Zaha Hadid, Thom Mayne, Daniel Libeskind, Frank Gehry, Rem Koolhaas, and Diébédo Francis Kéré.

In addition to 10–16 exhibitions annually, the museum hosts symposia, lecture series, and discussion events that target both professionals and interested laypeople.

== History ==
The “Galerie Aedes” was founded in 1980 on Grolmanstraße in Berlin by Kristin Feireiss and Helga Retzer, then head of the Berlin Artist Program of the DAAD.

On 3 June 1989, the gallery moved to the Stadtbahnbögen near Savignyplatz.

In 1995, Aedes opened a second location in the east of the city, founded by Kristin Feireiss (1942–2025) and Hans-Jürgen Commerell under the name "Aedes East" in the Hackesche Höfe in Berlin-Mitte, with the involvement of cultural theorist Ulla Giesler from 1996 onward. The work of Aedes has received numerous awards. In 2001, Kristin Feireiss was awarded the Federal Cross of Merit (on ribbon) for her contributions to architectural communication and fostering international exchange.

Since June 2006, the Aedes Architecture Forum has been located at the Pfefferberg site in the district of Berlin-Prenzlauer Berg.

== Exhibitions ==
To date, the Architecture Forum has hosted over 350 exhibitions.

A major exhibition during Berlin's designation as European City of Culture in 1988 was Berlin – Denkmal oder Denkmodell? – Architektonische Entwürfe für den Aufbruch in das 21. Jahrhundert ("Berlin – Monument or Model? – Architectural Designs for the Transition to the 21st Century"), which addressed the risks and opportunities of a divided city shortly before the Fall of the Berlin Wall. As part of Berlin’s Cultural Capital program, the exhibition traveled to Kyiv, Vienna, and Paris. Participants in this “open design concept” for the former capital included German and international architects and artists such as Christoph Ingenhoven, Daniel Libeskind, Gottfried Böhm, Coop Himmelb(l)au, Rob Krier, Zaha Hadid, Otto Steidle, Franco Stella, Peter Cook, Gustav Peichl, Axel Schultes, Claus Bury, and Lebbeus Woods. Featuring 82 contributors, the exhibition was organized by the Berlin Senator for Building and Housing and presented at the Staatliche Kunsthalle Berlin and the New Berlin Art Association.

Other notable exhibitions have included: ArchiAid: Rethinking-Reconstruction, focused on rebuilding efforts after the 2011 Tōhoku earthquake and tsunami in Japan; andChristoph Ingenhoven: Stuttgart Main Station – A Once-in-a-Century Project Becomes Reality.
