= Pedro Mesquita =

Portuguese footballer

Personal information
- Full name: Pedro Manuel Araújo Mesquita
- Date of birth: 10 May 1970 (age 56)
- Place of birth: Leça da Palmeira, Portugal
- Height: 1.73 m (5 ft 8 in)
- Position: Right back

Team information
- Current team: Almería B (assistant)

Youth career
- 1980–1988: Leixões

Senior career*
| Years | Team | Apps | (Gls) |
| 1988–1995 | Leixões | 190 | (5) |
| 1995–1997 | Rio Ave | 34 | (1) |
| 1997–1998 | Leça | 35 | (0) |
| 1998–1999 | Gil Vicente | 18 | (0) |
| 1999–2002 | Leça | 81 | (0) |
| 2002–2004 | Naval | 59 | (0) |
| Total | | 417 | (6) |

Managerial career
- 2004–2005: Chaves (assistant)
- 2005–2006: Lousada (assistant)
- 2008–2009: Leça (assistant)
- 2009–2010: Leça
- 2011–2012: Leixões (U15)
- 2012–2013: Aves (assistant)
- 2013–2014: Famalicão (assistant)
- 2015–2016: Leixões (assistant)
- 2019–2020: Almería B (assistant)
- 2020: Almería (assistant)
- 2020–: Almería B (assistant)
- * Club domestic league appearances and goals

Pedro Manuel Araújo Mesquita (born 10 May 1970) is a Portuguese retired footballer who played as a right back, and the current assistant manager of UD Almería B.
