= Lúcio Pereira =

Portuguese footballer

Personal information
- Full name: Eduardo Lúcio Esteves Pereira
- Date of birth: 1 September 1954 (age 72)
- Place of birth: Leça da Palmeira, Portugal
- Position: Goalkeeper

Youth career
- Leixões

Senior career*
| Years | Team | Apps | (Gls) |
| 1974–1982 | Leixões | 132 | (0) |
| 1982–1988 | Varzim | 189 | (0) |
| 1988–1991 | Tirsense | 95 | (0) |
| 1991–1993 | Varzim | 50 | (0) |
| 1993–1994 | São Pedro da Cova | | |
| Total | | 466 | (0) |

International career
| 1987 | Portugal | 1 | (0) |
- * Club domestic league appearances and goals

Eduardo Lúcio Esteves Pereira (born 1 September 1954 in Leça da Palmeira, Matosinhos), known as Lúcio, is a Portuguese former professional footballer who played as a goalkeeper.
