= Tidal pools of Leça de Palmeira =

Public swimming pool in Porto, Portugal

Tidal Pools de Leça da Palmeira
- Swimming pools
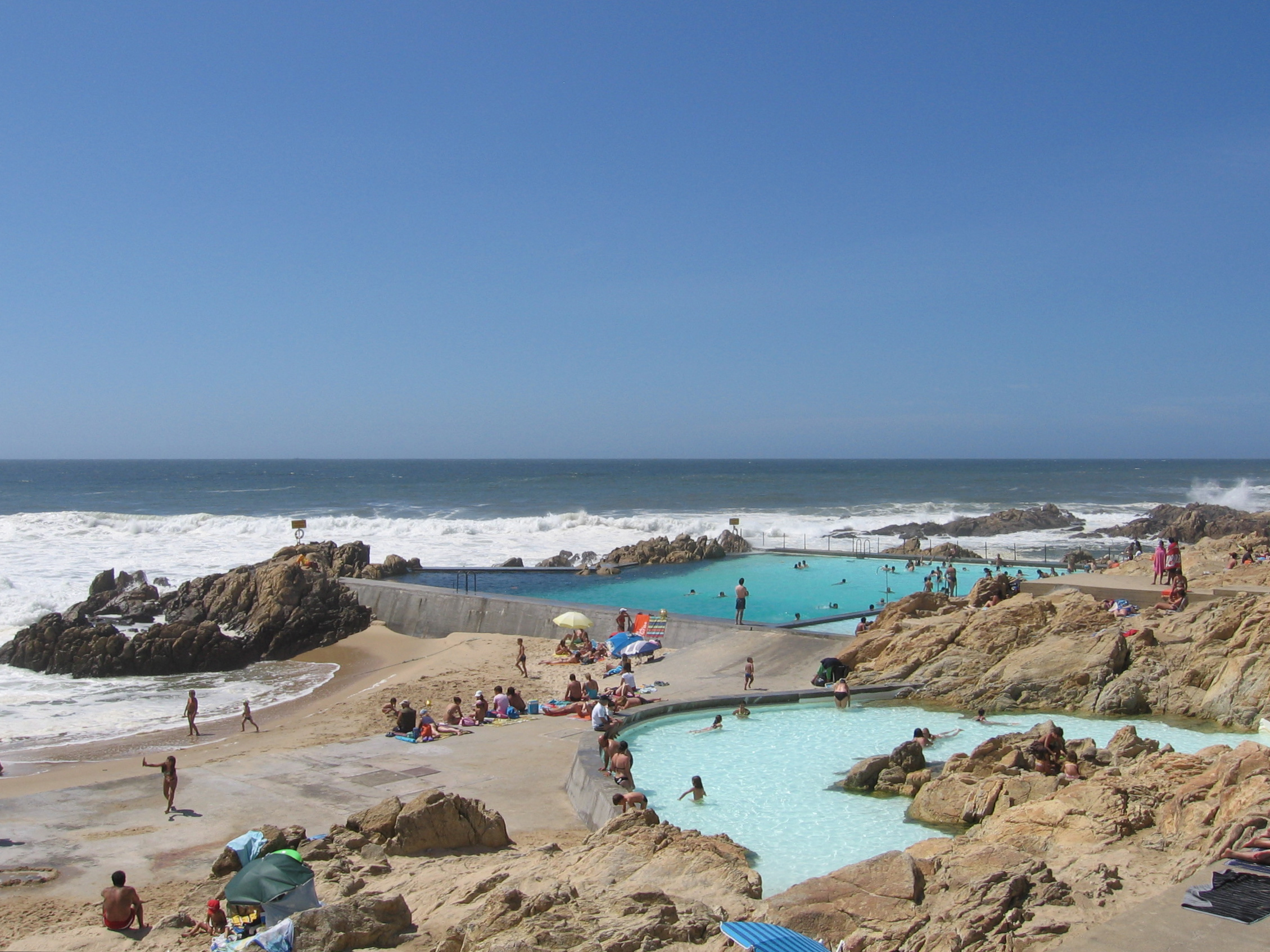
- Interactive map of Tidal Pools de Leça da Palmeira
- Coordinates: 41°11′34″N 8°42′28″W
- Location: Matosinhos e Leça da Palmeira

The Tidal Pools of Leça da Palmeira (Portuguese: Piscina das Marés de Leça da Palmeira) is a public swimming pool on the beach of Leça da Palmeira in Matosinhos municipality, in the district of Porto, Portugal. The structures consist of two natural pools filled with fresh sea water, designed and built between 1960 and 1973 by Portuguese architect Álvaro Siza Vieira. It is one of Siza Vieira's early projects and it is his second design in Leça da Palmeira following his work in the Boa Nova tea room, located 1 kilometre (0.62 mi) to the north of the pools.

In 2011, the pools were classified as a national monument and since 2017 they have been considered for UNESCO world heritage, together with the Boa Nova tea room and six other projects. The pools are also the only Portuguese building included in Thom Mayne's book 100 Buildings: 1900-2000.

The pools are open seasonally between June and September and are operated by the municipal company Matosinhos Sport.

== History ==
The pools were projected in 1960 and their construction came to an end in 1973. The final design excluded a restaurant in the north area of the pool, which had been included in a plan from 1961. In 2011, the building was classified as a national monument and in 2017 it was included in Portugal's tentative lists for UNESCO world heritage together with other works by the architect.

The pools were renovated several times over the past decades. In June 2004, 150 000 € were spent to repair its facilities, following vandalism from theft of 500 square meters of copper covering and pipping six months prior. Between 2019 and 2021, 1.3 million € were spent to address issues in the pools' reinforced concrete structure, the main tank and the salt water filtration system, among other. Siza Vieira was involved in the renovation works and altered the work's design in the northern section where the planned restaurant was never built.

== Architecture ==
The facility is situated on the rocky outcrops in a linear form, paralleling the Avenida da Liberdade and the ocean, framed by the landscape.

The saltwater pool has an irregular, rectangular plan, constructed over the outcrops and structured along the linear wall that delimits the beach. Access to the structure is conditioned by a route framed by raw cement, along which there are orthogonal and linear views that induce the view to look at focal points of the landscape. Below the walls are various support structures.

According to architect Alves Costa, the structure was an attempt at integration at the site that created an artificial world within the natural landscape, as if the artificial was normal to nature.

== Gallery ==
Building

Entrance ramp from the seafront promenade

Walkway between concrete walls with a cantilevered roof

Shore-side passage with a timber roof

Adults’ pool

Children’s pool

Children’s pool
