= Matosinhos e Leça da Palmeira =

- Civil parish
- Location in Portugal
- Coordinates: 41.187°N 8.687°W
- Country: Portugal
- Region: Norte
- Metropolitan area: Porto
- District: Porto
- Municipality: Matosinhos
- Disbanded: 2025

Area
  - Total: 12.16 km^{2} (4.70 sq mi)

Population (2021)
  - Total: 49,034
  - Density: 4,032/km^{2} (10,440/sq mi)
- Time zone: UTC+00:00 (WET)
  - Summer (DST): UTC+01:00 (WEST)

Matosinhos e Leça da Palmeira was a civil parish in the municipality of Matosinhos, Northern Portugal. It was formed in 2013 by the merger of the former parishes Matosinhos and Leça da Palmeira. It was dissolved in 2025. The population in 2021 was 49,034, in an area of 12.16 square kilometres (4.70 mi^{2}).

== History ==
It was founded in 2013, as part of a national administrative reform, by the aggregation of the former parishes of Matosinhos and Leça da Palmeira and has its headquarters in Matosinhos.
