= Iberê Camargo Foundation =

Museum in Porto Alegre, Brazil

- Fundação Iberê Camargo
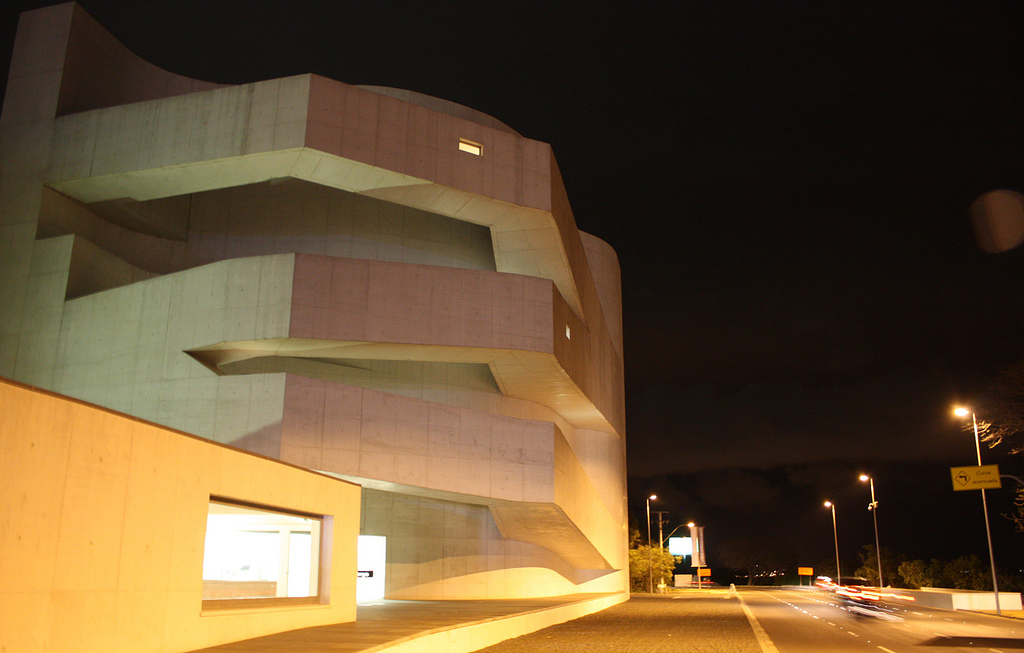
- Iberê Camargo Foundation museum at night.
- Established: 1995
- Location: Porto Alegre, Rio Grande do Sul, Brazil
- Website: www.iberecamargo.org.br

The Iberê Camargo Foundation (Portuguese: Fundação Iberê Camargo) is a cultural institution and museum located in Porto Alegre, Brazil. The Foundation is dedicated to preserving and promoting the work of Brazilian painter Iberê Camargo (1914–1994).

== History ==
Created in 1995, one year after the artist's death, it not only aims to make people know Camargo's art but also intends to stimulate reflections on the contemporary artistic production, through displays, courses, seminars and meetings.

The headquarters and museum building of the Iberê Camargo Foundation were designed by Pritzker Prize–winning Portuguese architect Álvaro Siza. Before the inauguration of the building in May 2008, the foundation was operating in the late artist's home, also in Porto Alegre. The new building is located on the bank of Guaíba Lake.

The honorary president of Iberê Camargo Foundation is his widow, Maria Coussirat Camargo.

== Gallery ==
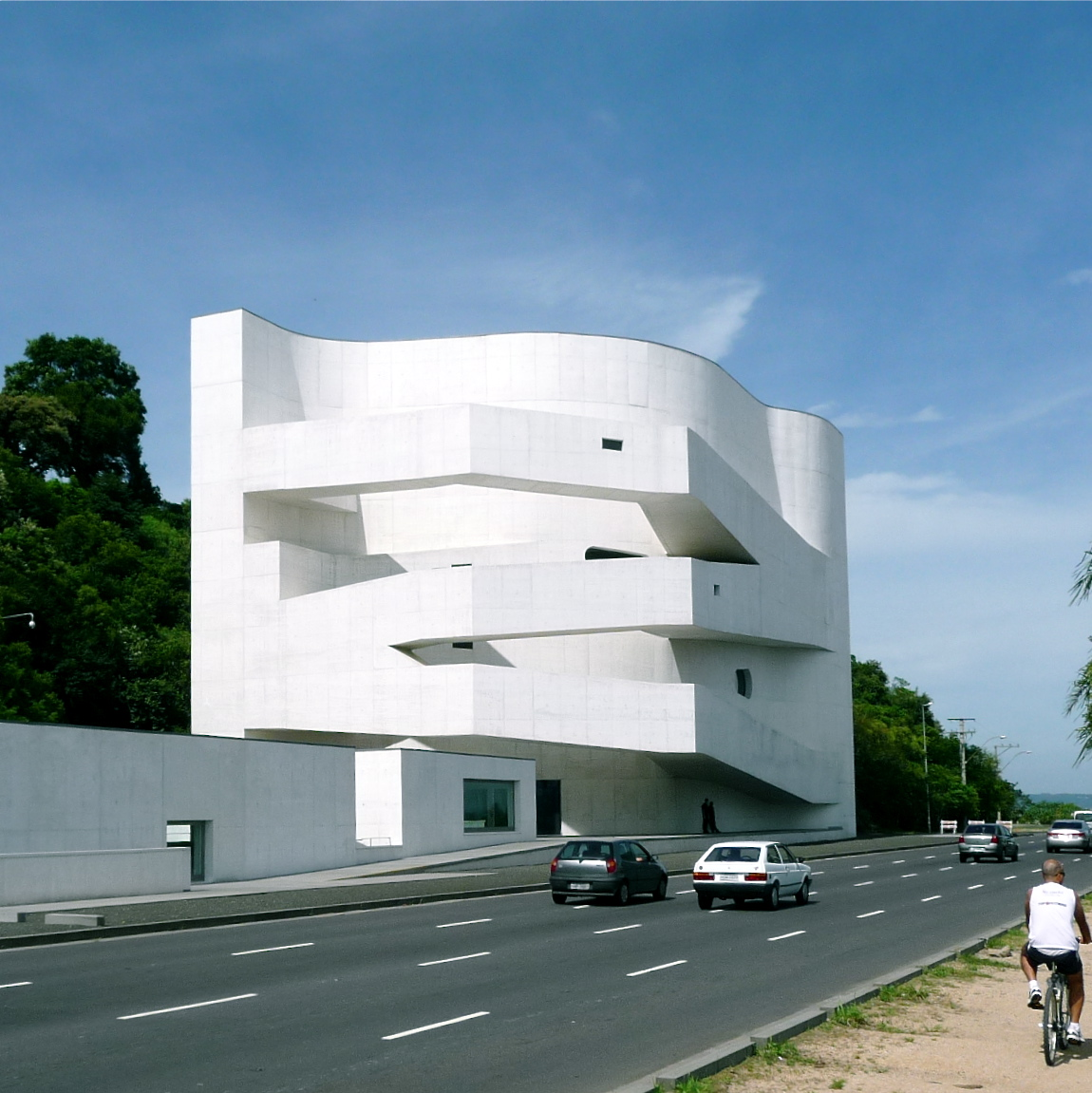
Exterior

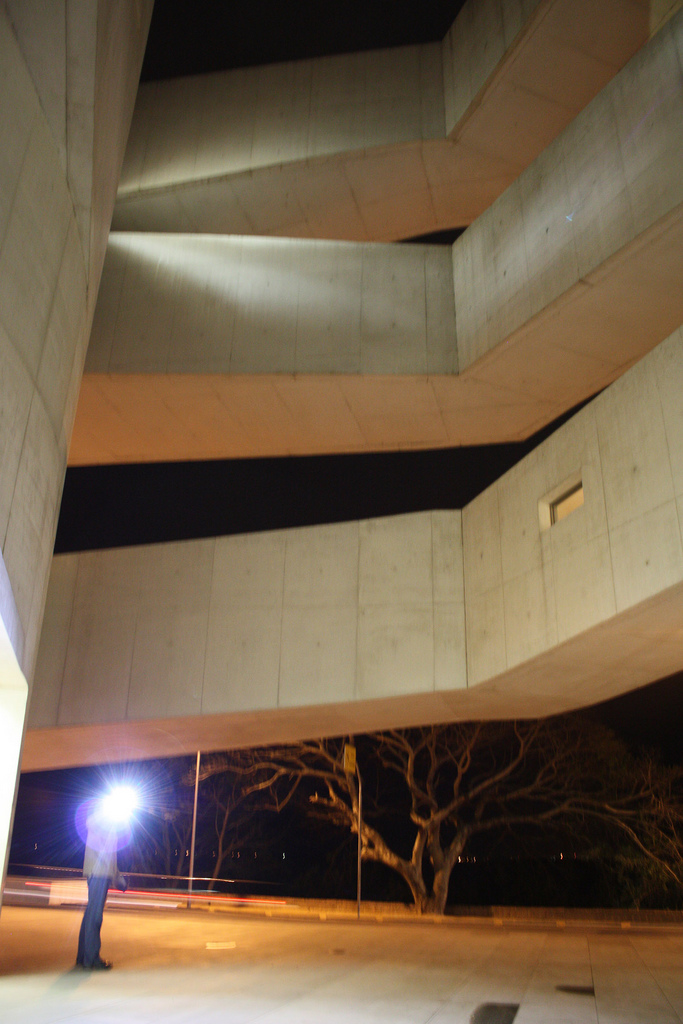
Exterior

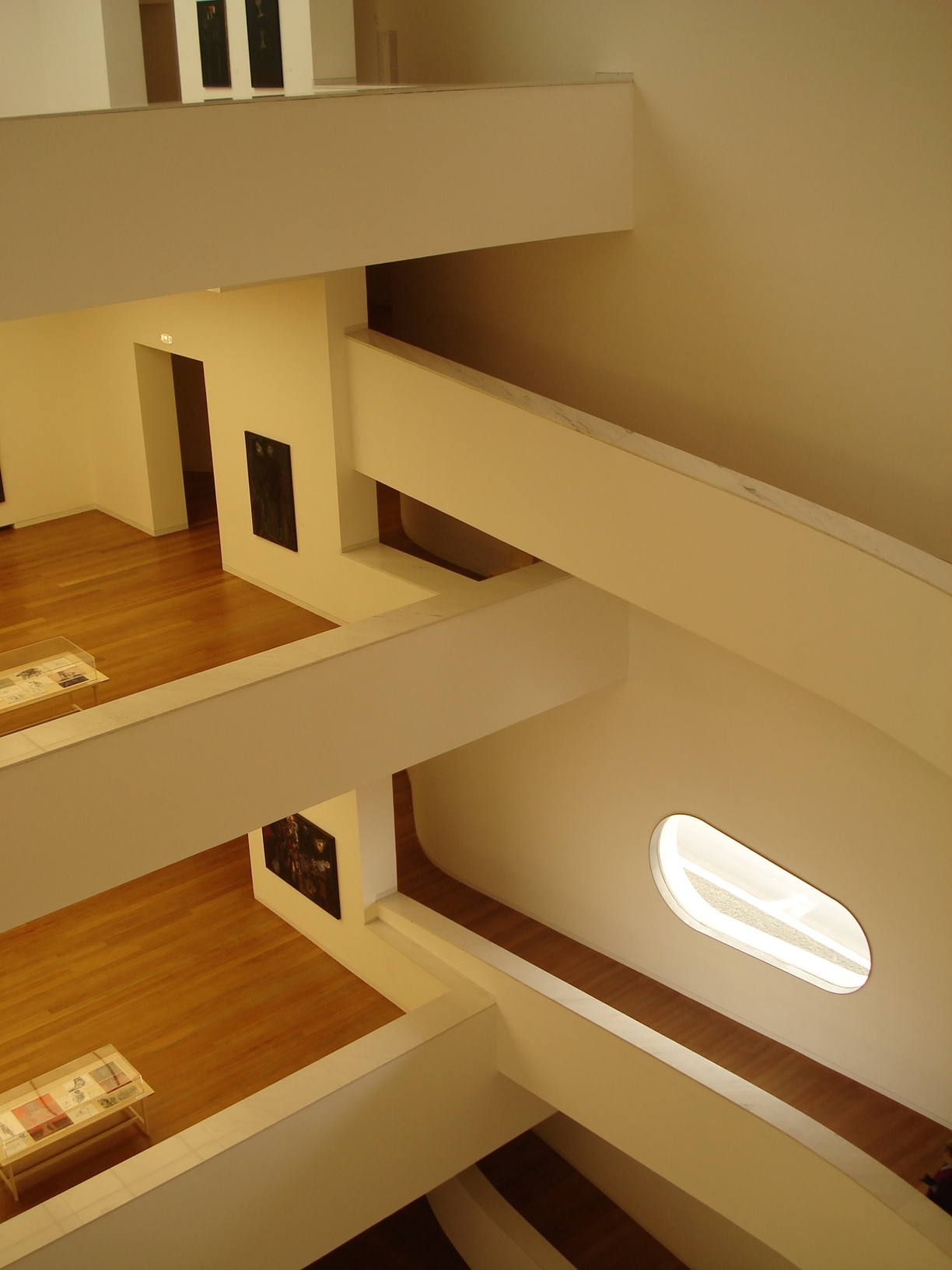
Interior

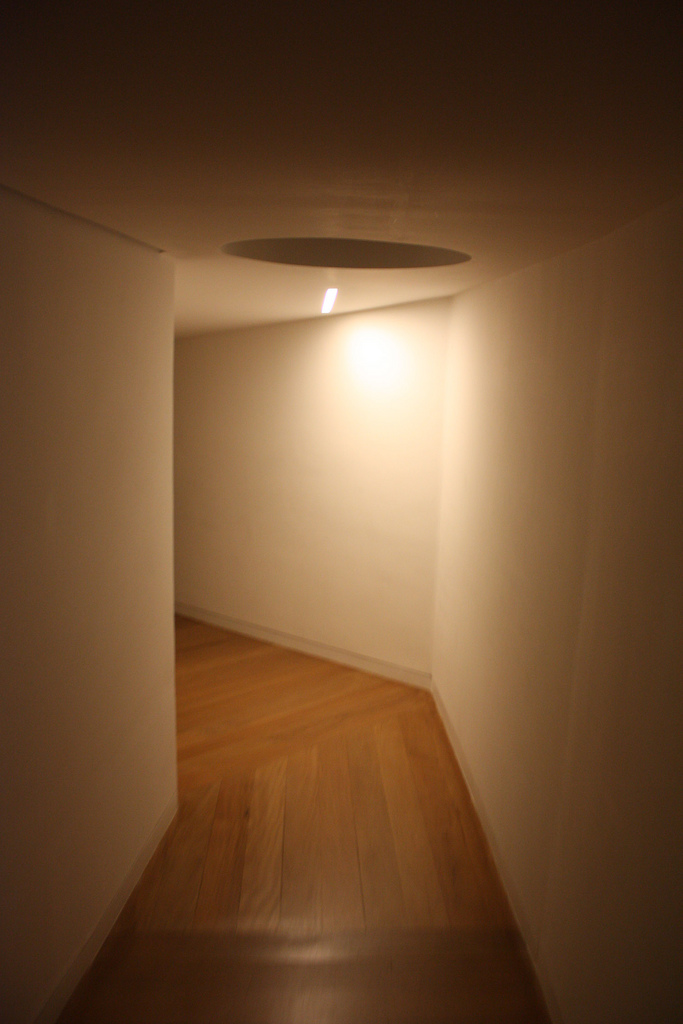
Interior
