= Leça da Palmeira =

- Civil parish
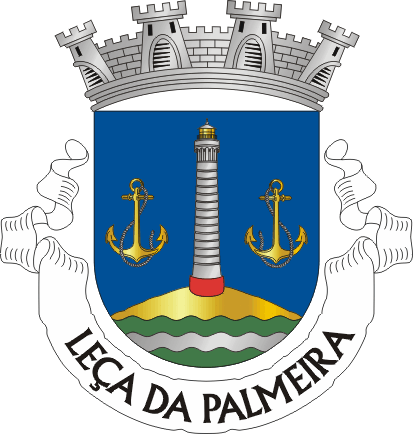
- Coat of arms

- Coordinates: 41°11′37″N 8°41′50″W
- Country: Portugal
- Region: Norte
- Metropolitan area: Porto
- District: Porto
- Municipality: Matosinhos

Area
  - Total: 5.97 km^{2} (2.31 sq mi)

Population (2011)
  - Total: 18,502
  - Density: 3,100/km^{2} (8,030/sq mi)
- Time zone: UTC+00:00 (WET)
  - Summer (DST): UTC+01:00 (WEST)

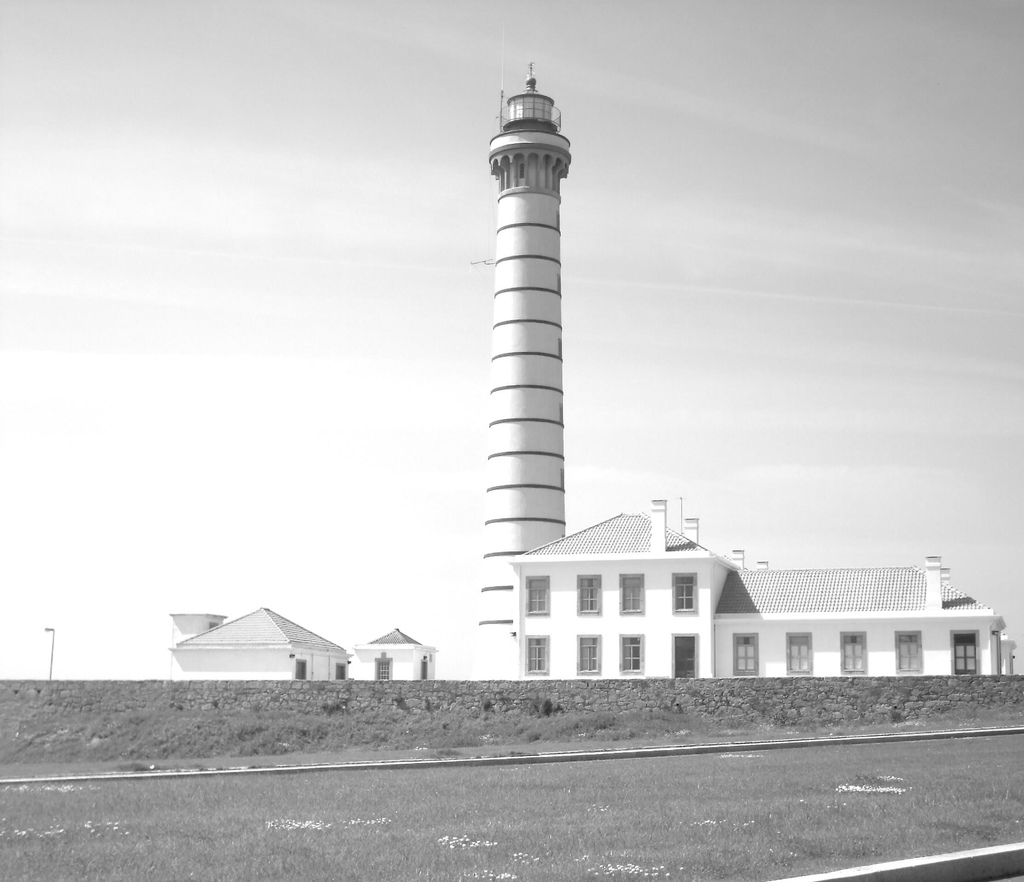
Farol da Boa Nova, Leça da Palmeira.

Leça da Palmeira (Portuguese pronunciation: [ˈlɛsɐ ðɐ palˈmɐjɾɐ]) is a civil parish in the Portuguese city of Matosinhos north of the Leça river. It was merged with the parish of Matosinhos in 2013, forming Matosinhos e Leça da Palmeira. It was restored in 2025. The parish covers 5.97 square kilometres (2.31 mi^{2}) and had 18,502 inhabitants in the 2011 census.

Piscinas de Marés

Its cultural heritage includes the Fort of Leça da Palmeira, Leça Lighthouse and religious monuments such as Corpo Santo, Santana, and Boa Nova churches. The parish includes three spaces designed by renowned Portuguese architects, Piscinas de Marés, a public pool by the beach, and Boa Nova Tea House, both designed by Siza Vieira and Quinta da Conceição Municipal Park designed by Fernando Távora.

In sport, the parish includes a football club, Leça FC, and a basketball club, Grupo Desportivo de Basquete de Leça.

== History ==
The history of Leça da Palmeira dates back to Roman times, with its name likely derived from Lettia, a Roman villa located along the banks of the Leça River. The area was historically a stopping point for pilgrims traveling from the Holy Land, and it is believed that the name "Leça da Palmeira" refers to the location where these pilgrims, known as palmeiros, would disembark and rest.

The first historical mention of the locality appears in 1081, when it was referred to as Villa Fosse de Leza. By the early 13th century, the area was home to a significant church dedicated to Saint Michael (São Miguel), which became a key part of the region's identity. This led to variations in the name of the area over time, including São Miguel de Leça da Palmeira, São Miguel da Palmeira, and São Miguel de Bouças, the later named after the locality of Bouças in Matosinhos, the municipal seat at the time.

== Economy ==
Leça da Palmeira's economy has been significantly shaped by its coastal location and industrial history. It is home to Portugal's second largest seaport, Leixões.

A large oil refinery operated by Galp Energia was located in the northern end of Leça da Palmeira, but it was shut down in April 2021. The land where the oil refinery was located is being redeveloped into an "Innovation District," focusing on future energy technologies, research, and development, including a new campus of the University of Porto. The closure marked a significant transition for the local economy, affecting approximately 400 workers, with 150 being laid off and others redeployed within the company. As of 2024, a significant number of former employees remained unemployed.

== Notable people ==
- Tamagnini Batista (born 1949) known as Nené, a former footballer, who played for Benfica
- Fernando Caiado (1925–2006) was a footballer and manager, who played as midfielder
- António Frasco (born 1955) known as Frasco, a former footballer who played as an attacking midfielder
- Pedro Mesquita (born 1970) is a former footballer who played as a right back
- Domingos Paciência (born 1969) a former footballer who played as a striker, currently a manager
- Lúcio Pereira (born 1954), known as Lúcio, is a former footballer who played as a goalkeeper
- Eliseu Ramalho (born 1952), known as Eliseu, is a former footballer who played as a midfielder
- Vladimir Stojković (born 1996) is a Portuguese footballer with Serbian ancestry who plays as a goalkeeper
