= Expo '98 =

1998 World's Fair in Lisbon, Portugal

Coordinates: 38.7677°N 9.0958°W

1998 Lisbon
- The Expo '98 logo

Overview
- BIE-class: Specialized exposition
- Category: International specialized exposition
- Name: Exposição Internacional de Lisboa de 1998
- Building(s): Torre Vasco da Gama
- Area: 50 hectares (120 acres)
- Visitors: 10,128,204

Participant(s)
- Countries: 143

Location
- Country: Portugal
- City: Lisbon
- Venue: Parque Expo

Timeline
- Awarded: 1992
- Opening: 22 May 1998
- Closure: 30 September 1998

Specialized expositions
- Previous: Expo '93 in Daejeon
- Next: Expo 2008 in Zaragoza

Universal expositions
- Previous: Expo '92 in Seville
- Next: Expo 2000 in Hanover

Horticultural expositions
- Previous: Expo '93 in Stuttgart
- Next: Expo '99 in Kunming

Expo '98 (1998 Lisbon Specialised Expo) was an official specialised World's Fair held in Lisbon, Portugal from Friday, 22 May (opening ceremony on 21 May), to Wednesday, 30 September 1998. The theme of the fair was "The Oceans, a Heritage for the Future", chosen in part to commemorate 500 years of Portuguese discoveries. The Expo received over 10 million visitors in 132 days, while 143 countries and many organizations were represented.

== Before ==
The idea to organize a World's Fair in Portugal originated in 1989 between two Portuguese, António Mega Ferreira and Vasco Graça Moura, who were in charge of organizing the commemoration of the 500th anniversary of Vasco da Gama's arrival in India in 1498.

Once government support was obtained, Ferreira led the bid at the Bureau International des Expositions, which in 1992 declared Lisbon the winner, against the other contender Toronto, Canada. The state-owned company Parque Expo was formed to make the Fair a self-sustaining event, with revenue coming from admission tickets and, especially, sales of real estate and parcel lots at the Expo's emplacement.

The first Commissioner of Expo '98 (and Parque Expo's CEO) was António Cardoso e Cunha. He was replaced in 1997 by José de Melo Torres Campos, after a general election resulted in a change in government.

The area chosen for the Expo '98 was a 5-kilometre-wide (3.1 mi) strip that covered 50 hectares (0.2 mi^{2}) in Lisbon's east-end alongside the Tagus river. The area had been landscaped in 1942 as a Hydroport, for docking the hydroplanes that crossed the Atlantic to and from the US. When the modern jet planes rendered the hydroplanes obsolete, the place became an industrial park of containers, polluting industries and slaughterhouses which had seen a growing degradation over the decades.

As a result, the Expo '98 was fully built from scratch. Every building was pre-sold for after-Expo repurposing thus ensuring that, after the expo closed, the site would not be left semi-abandoned, as had happened with previous expos, particularly Seville Expo '92. As a reminder of the site's industrial past, only a refinery tower was kept and repurposed.

To support the expected influx of visitors, an extensive access program was devised, including:

- a new bridge across the river, the Vasco da Gama Bridge (then the longest in Europe)
- a new line for the Lisbon Metro, with seven stations (five of which were ready for opening day)
- a new main multi-modal terminal, featuring trains, metro, buses, and taxis, called Gare do Oriente, by architect Santiago Calatrava.

== During ==
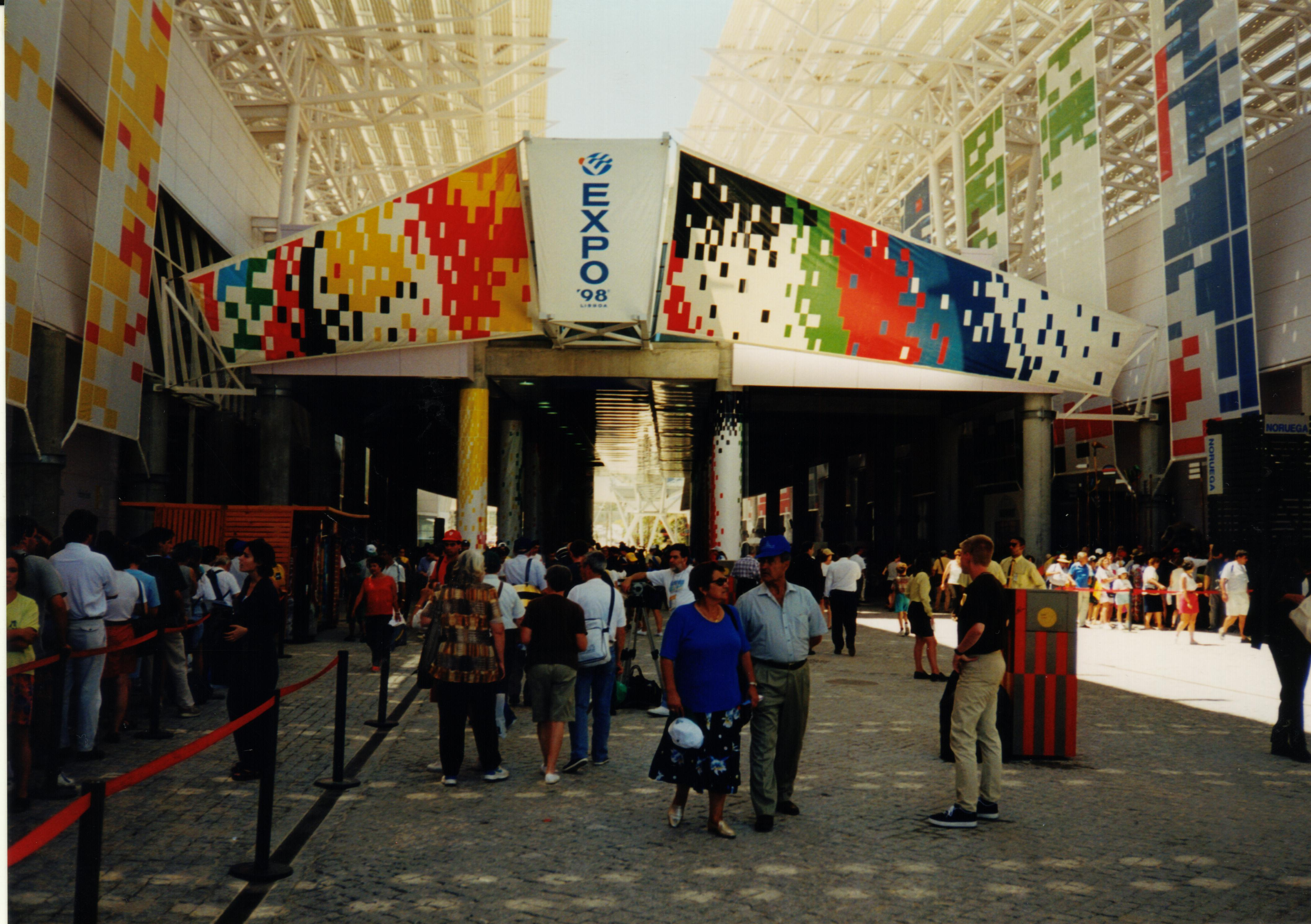
Two pavilions on the Expo '98, now hosting the Feira Internacional de Lisboa

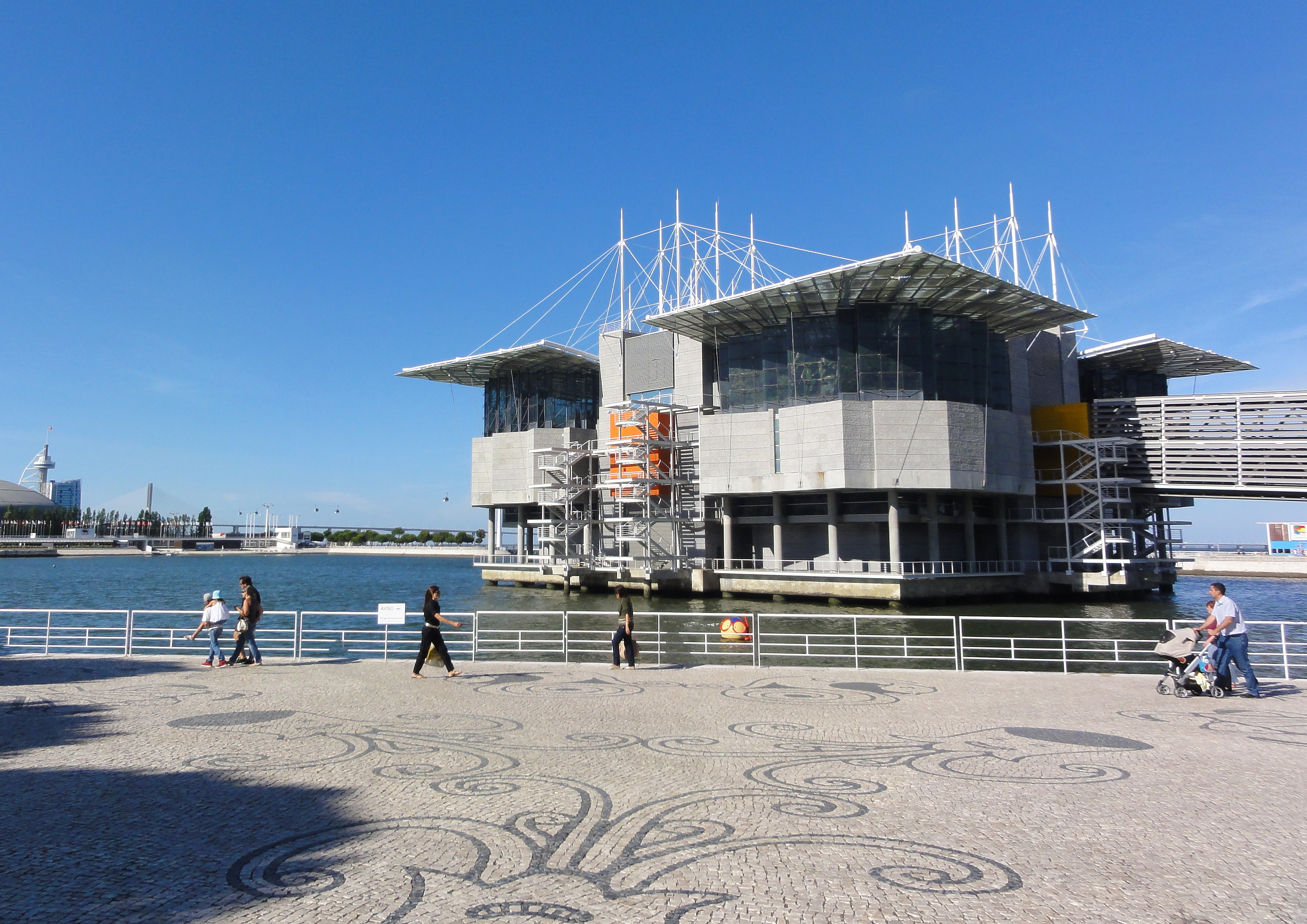
Oceans Pavilion, now the Lisbon Oceanarium

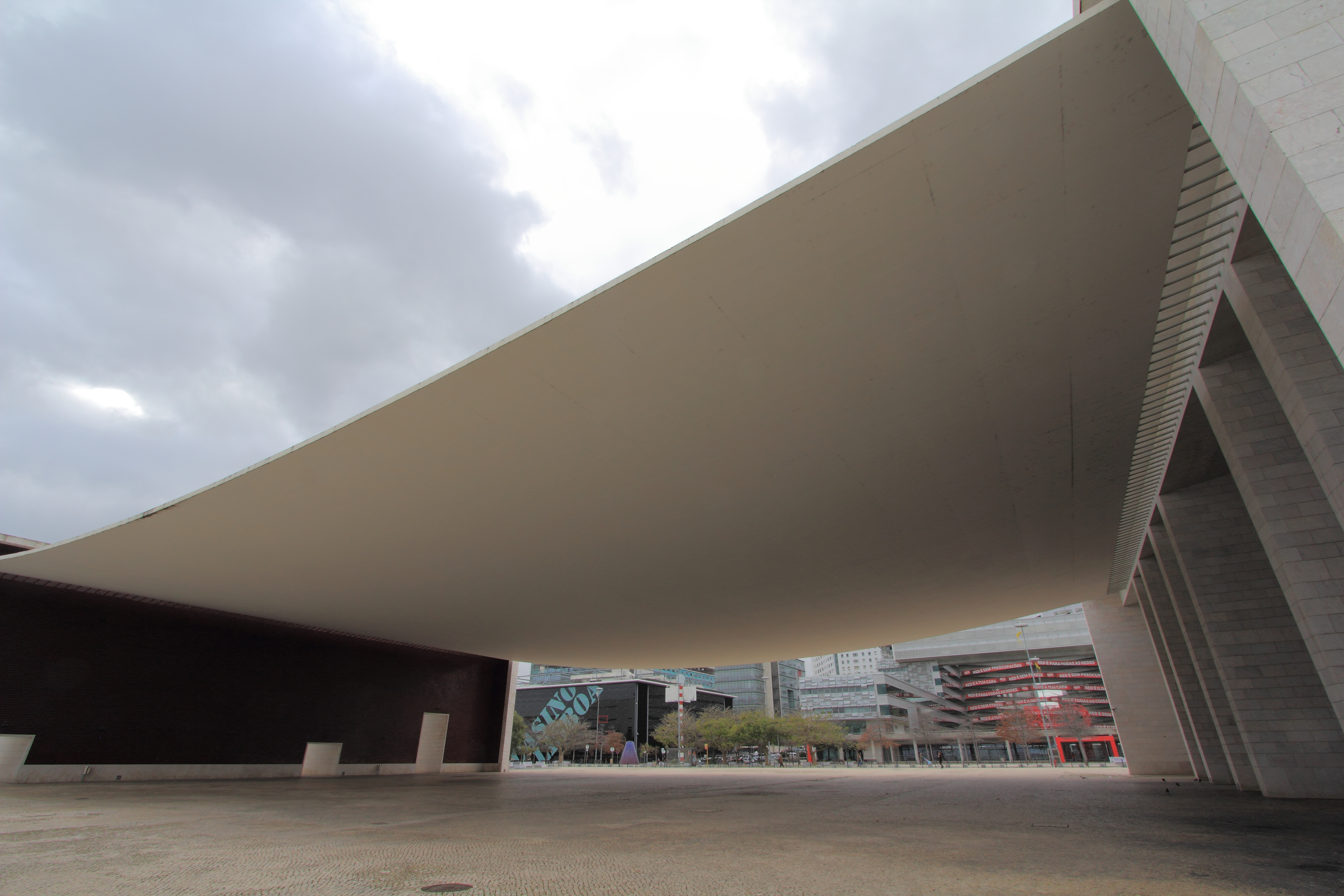
Pavilion of Portugal with its concrete veil (designed by Álvaro Siza Vieira)

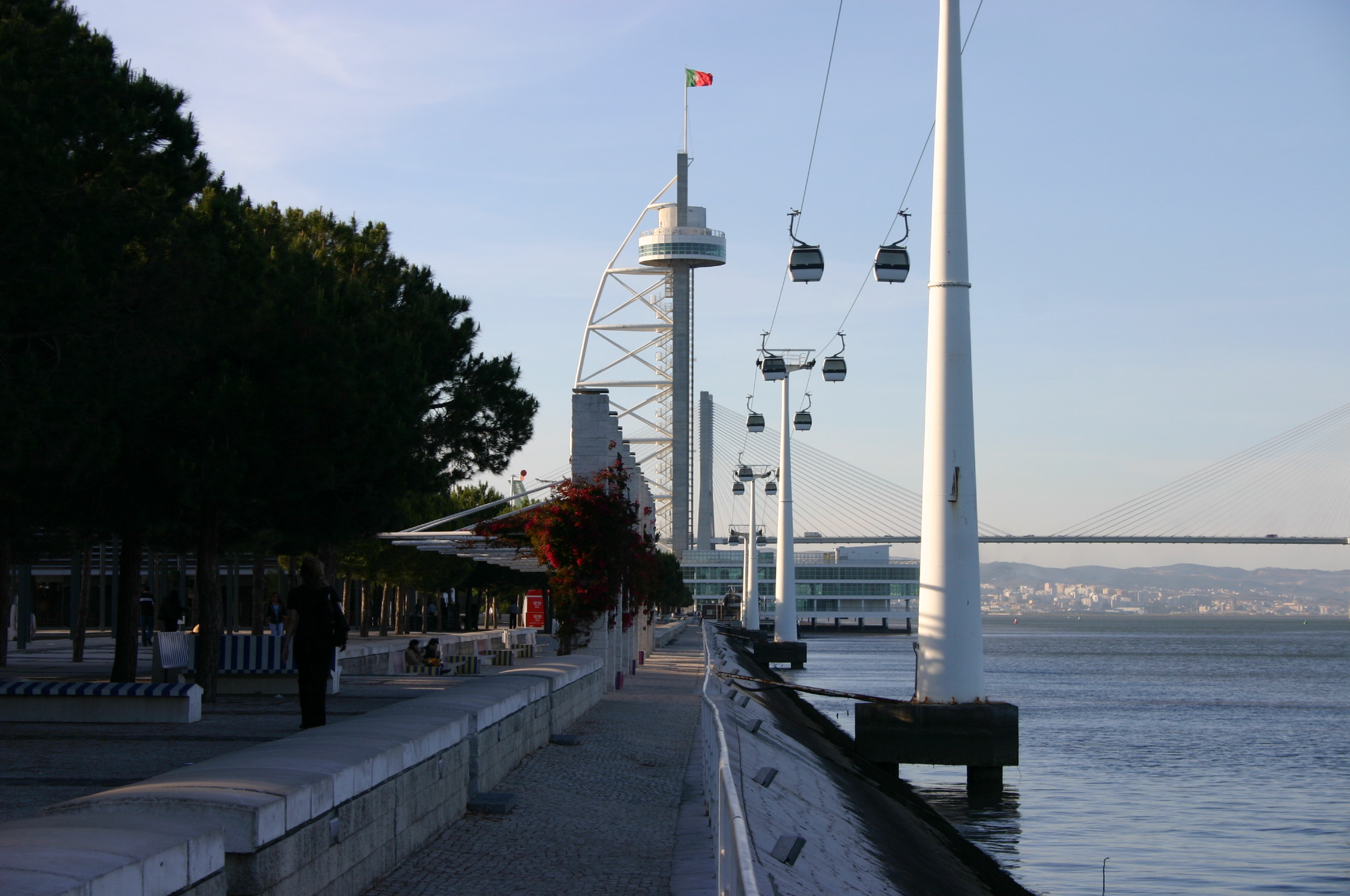
Torre Vasco da Gama cable car

Expo '98 opened on 22 May 1998 with 143 countries and 14 international organizations featured in individual pavilions: almost every exhibitor respected the Expo's theme "The Oceans: A Heritage for the Future". There were additional themed pavilions dedicated to Water, Sea Knowledge, Virtual Reality (paid), The Future, Oceans and Oceanophilia; as well as exhibitions: "Leonardo da Vinci@expo98 – La Dinamica dell'Acqua", "Roads of the Porcelain" and "Shells and Man". Additional attractions included a 15,000-seater Utopia Pavilion with a resident theatrical show, Camões Theatre, nautical exhibition, Garcia de Orta tropical gardens, Swatch Pavilion, "World of Coca-Cola" exhibition, Expo Adrenalin, 120-metre-tall observation tower (paid), funicular (paid) and the nightly water-show "Acqua Matrix".

Out of the five major themed pavilions at Lisbon's Expo '98, the Utopia Pavilion was among the most popular. Reflecting the Expo's overall theme of "The Oceans: a Heritage for the Future" and designed by the renowned François Confino and Philippe Genty, the pavilion featured a large-scale multimedia show that presented the oceans as stimulators of imagery, taking visitors on a voyage from the creation of the world to the present day. Combining traditional stage technology with highly innovative special effects and mechanical controls, gsmprjct intégration handled all of the logistics and technical direction of the project. Housed in a custom-built covered stadium with a seating capacity of 10,000, the show was performed over 500 times, making it the first World's Fair show to be seen by over 3 million people.

The Oceania Virtual Reality Pavilion was the biggest hit of Lisbon's Expo '98, attracting over half a million visitors in a four-month period. Even so, the average waiting time for admission was about four hours. It consisted of a virtual submarine voyage to an underwater base where visitors discovered the ruins of a lost civilization and encountered a sea monster before escaping back to the surface in Teleport capsules. Despite being the only pavilion at Expo '98 that required an additional admission fee, visitors spent hours waiting in line for this breathtaking 30-minute thrill ride that made use of seamlessly integrated simulators, virtual reality visors and interactive projections. gsmprjct° was commissioned to design and produce "Oceania", planning the look and feel of the overall experience, in addition to acting as project manager, architectural coordinator, and general contractor. Divided into several rooms, the pavilion featured a 45-person simulated submarine ride and 70 mm film, a 3D stereoscopic viewing system with custom content, and custom-designed motion simulators with audio-visual content.

The pavilion of Portugal hosted the Portuguese national representation during the event. It was designed by Álvaro Siza Vieira. The entrance to the building was covered by a large concrete veil, mimicking a paper sheet linking two main buildings and opening a wide urban space.

The total number of visitors of the Expo '98 reached 10,128,204, for a duration of 132 days. Admission prices (adult) were 5,000 escudos PTE (US$34 at then-exchange rates) for one day, 12,500 escudos ($84) for three non-consecutive days and 50,000 escudos ($334) for three months. The Oceans Pavilion, built to be the Lisbon Oceanarium after the Expo closed, had the longest lines. Other popular pavilions, with lines of up to five hours on busier days, included Portugal, Spain, Sweden, Germany, and Virtual Reality.

=== Logo, Mascot and Music ===
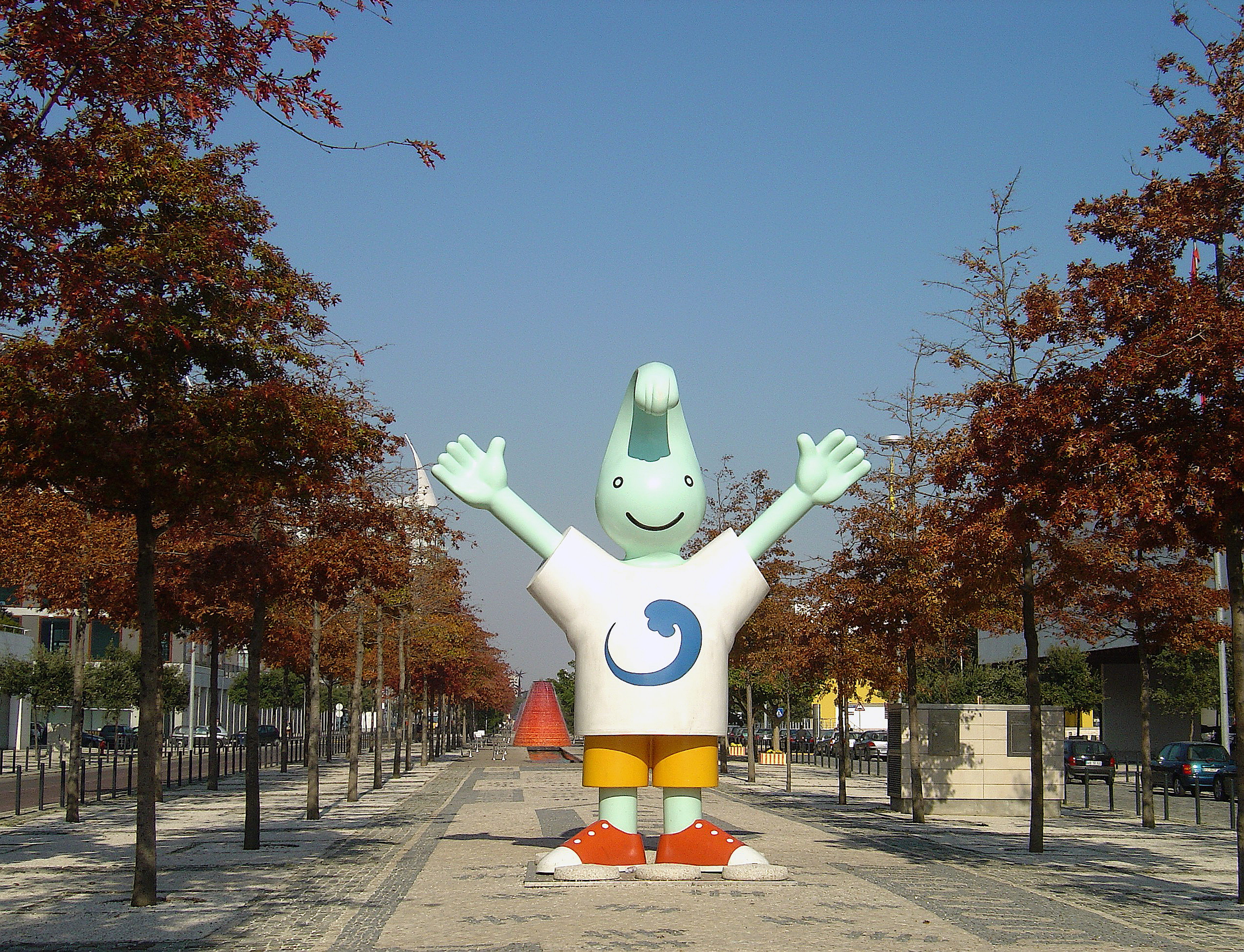
Mascot "Gil"

The Expo logo symbolizes the Sea and the Sun. It was conceived by Portuguese Augusto Tavares Dias, creative director in an advertising agency, and selected from 1,288 entries.

The Expo mascot was conceived by the Portuguese duo of painter António Modesto and sculptor Artur Moreira. It was selected from 309 entries. It is named Gil, after Portuguese navigator Gil Eanes. The name was chosen by high school student José Luís Coelho, from 765 entries. Gil turned the RTP mascot and can be see on the station main events.

The official music theme for the Expo '98 was called "Pangaea" and was written by Nuno Rebelo. It combined chants and instruments from the five continents over an epic full orchestral score.

== After ==
Expo '98 closed on 30 September 1998. The last day saw more than 300 thousand visitors enter, there to see the closing fireworks show, the largest ever presented in Portugal. The site remained closed until 15 October 1998, when it reopened as Parque das Nações (Park of the Nations), a free-access park, keeping the gardens, Oceanarium (Europe's then-largest aquarium), observation tower, funicular, and the Virtual Reality pavilion. Other buildings were re-purposed for the opening, including:

- the main entrance (sun door), converted to Centro Vasco da Gama, a regional shopping mall (opened on 27 April 1999)
- the main exhibition pavilions, converted to Feira Internacional de Lisboa (Lisbon International Exhibition Fair)
- Utopia Pavilion, converted to Pavilhão Atlântico (now Meo Arena, after the naming rights were sold to a sponsor), Lisbon's main multi-purpose indoor arena
- Knowledge of the Seas Pavilion, converted to Knowledge Pavilion, a hands-on science museum
- Pavilion of the Territory, converted to a bowling alley, but subsequently demolished
- Pavilion of the Future, now the Casino Lisboa.

Within Parque das Nações, every other building or vacant parcel lot was sold for office or living space, to offset the Expo's costs. The Virtual Reality Pavilion was closed on 31 August 2002 and later demolished. The area today is thriving, modern, stylish, and safe, attracting 18 million tourists a year to its gardens, museums, commercial areas and modern buildings. It has also become permanent residency for up to 25,000 people and one of Lisbon's premier business centers, with many multinational corporations basing their headquarters in its main avenue.

Parque Expo had lived beyond Expo '98, not just managing the infrastructure of Parque das Nações but, having acquired the know-how in urban conversion and planning, sold its advising and consultancy services to other cities around the world. The company was extinct at the end of 2012 and the former territory of the exposition became a new parish of Lisbon municipality.
