= Leça Lighthouse =

Lighthouse in Portugal

Leça Lighthouse Farol de Leça
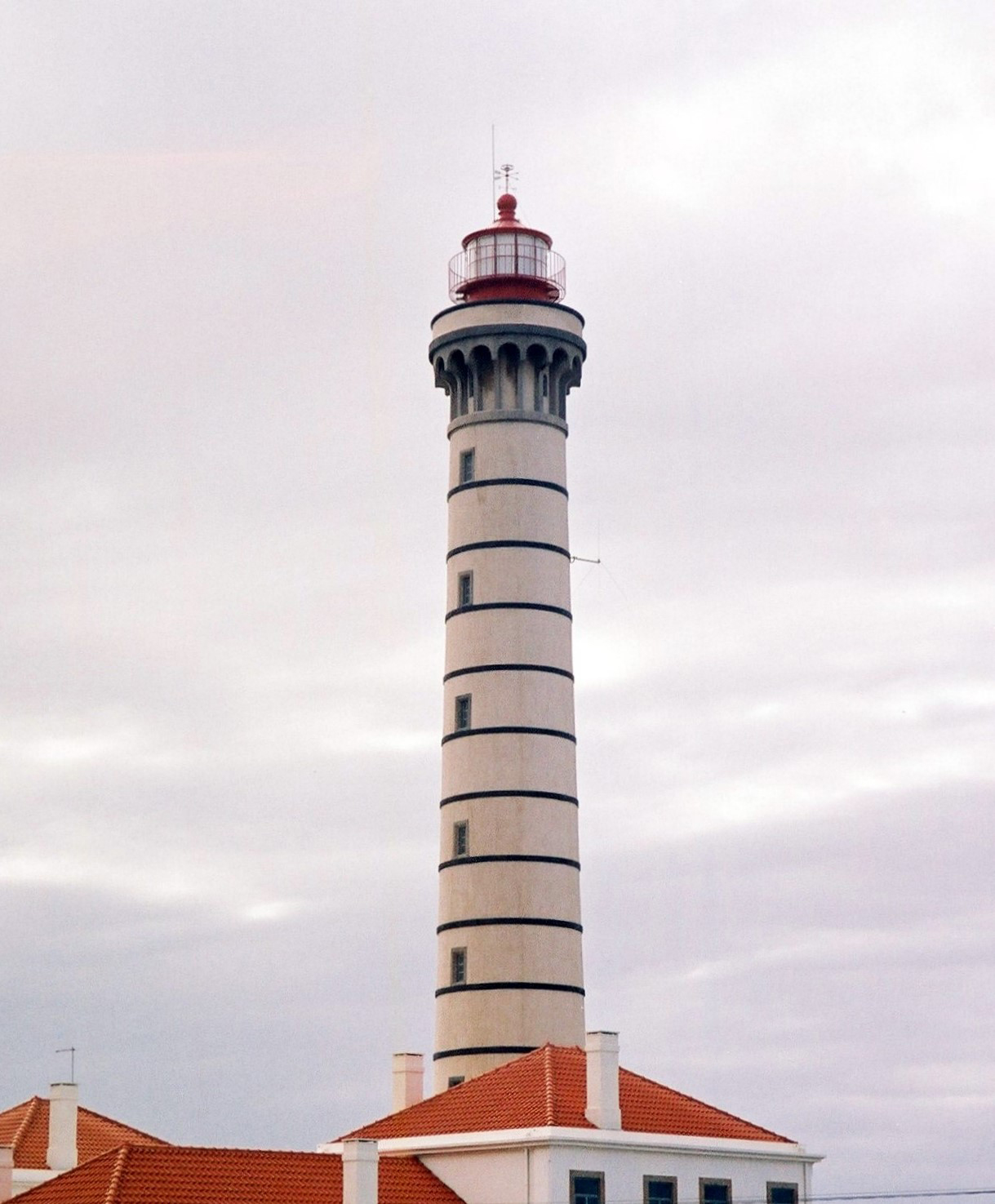
- Leça Lighthouse
- Location: Matosinhos, Porto District, Portugal
- Coordinates: 41°12′05″N 8°42′44″W

Tower
- Constructed: 1927
- Construction: concrete
- Automated: 1979
- Height: 46 metres (151 ft)
- Heritage: heritage without legal protection

Light
- Focal height: 50 m (160 ft)
- Lens: third order Fresnel lens
- Range: 28 nautical miles
- Characteristic: Fl (3) W 14s

The Leça Lighthouse (Portuguese: Farol de Leça), also known as the Farol de Boa Nova, is a lighthouse on the Atlantic coast located in Leça da Palmeira, in the municipality of Matosinhos in the Porto District of Portugal. It is the second-tallest lighthouse in Portugal.

== History ==
Between 1916 and 1926, about 380 meters northwest of the present lighthouse, there was a smaller lighthouse known as the Farolim da Boa Nova, a square white tower about 12 meters high, topped by a green lantern, with fixed white light. After the opening of the new Leça Lighthouse, it ceased to operate and initially served as a dormitory for the students of the School of Lighthouse Keepers, later being demolished. The stone masonry that provided the base for the tower can still be seen.

The Leça Lighthouse came into operation on a trial basis on 15 December 1926. It was officially inaugurated on 20 February 1927. In 1938 a radio signal was installed. Conservation work was carried out in 1948 and in 1950 the clockwork mechanism was replaced by electrical motors to rotate the lenses. Shortly after this, the lighthouse was equipped with an elevator to access the light. Further repair and conservation took place in 1958.

In 1962, the School of Lighthouse Keepers, which had offered courses at the site since 1926, was closed. In 1964 the lighthouse was connected to the public electricity grid and a 3,000W lamp was installed, which gave it a range of 60 nautical miles. In 1979, as part of the automation of the lighthouses in the area, including the Felgueiras Lighthouse at the entrance of the Douro river, these lighthouses started to be remotely controlled from the Leça Lighthouse, by means of equipment especially designed for the purpose. It was the first network of remote-controlled lighthouses on the Portuguese coast. The power of the light source was reduced, with the installation of a 1,000W lamp.

In 2001, because they were no longer of great interest for navigation, all radio transmissions to shipping from Portuguese lighthouses were ended. In 2005, major works were undertaken to remodel and improve the lighthouse.

== Characteristics ==
The lighthouse has a height of 46 metres (151 ft) and a focal height of 50 metres (160 ft). It consists of a white conical tower, in reinforced concrete, with narrow black stripes separating the ten floors, as well as accompanying buildings. In one annex building there is a small museum, with an exhibition of parts and mechanisms related to the theme of lighthouses.

Its white light reaches approximately 28 nautical miles (52 kilometres) and its illumination system consists of a rotating directional crystal optic with six lenses. Its light signal produces three light flashes every 14 seconds. The tower has 225 steps: 213 in reinforced concrete forming a spiral staircase, belonging to the tower; and 12 in cast iron that are part of the light.

== See also ==
- List of lighthouses in Portugal
