= Pavilhão de Portugal =

Building in Lisbon, Portugal

- Pavilhão de Portugal
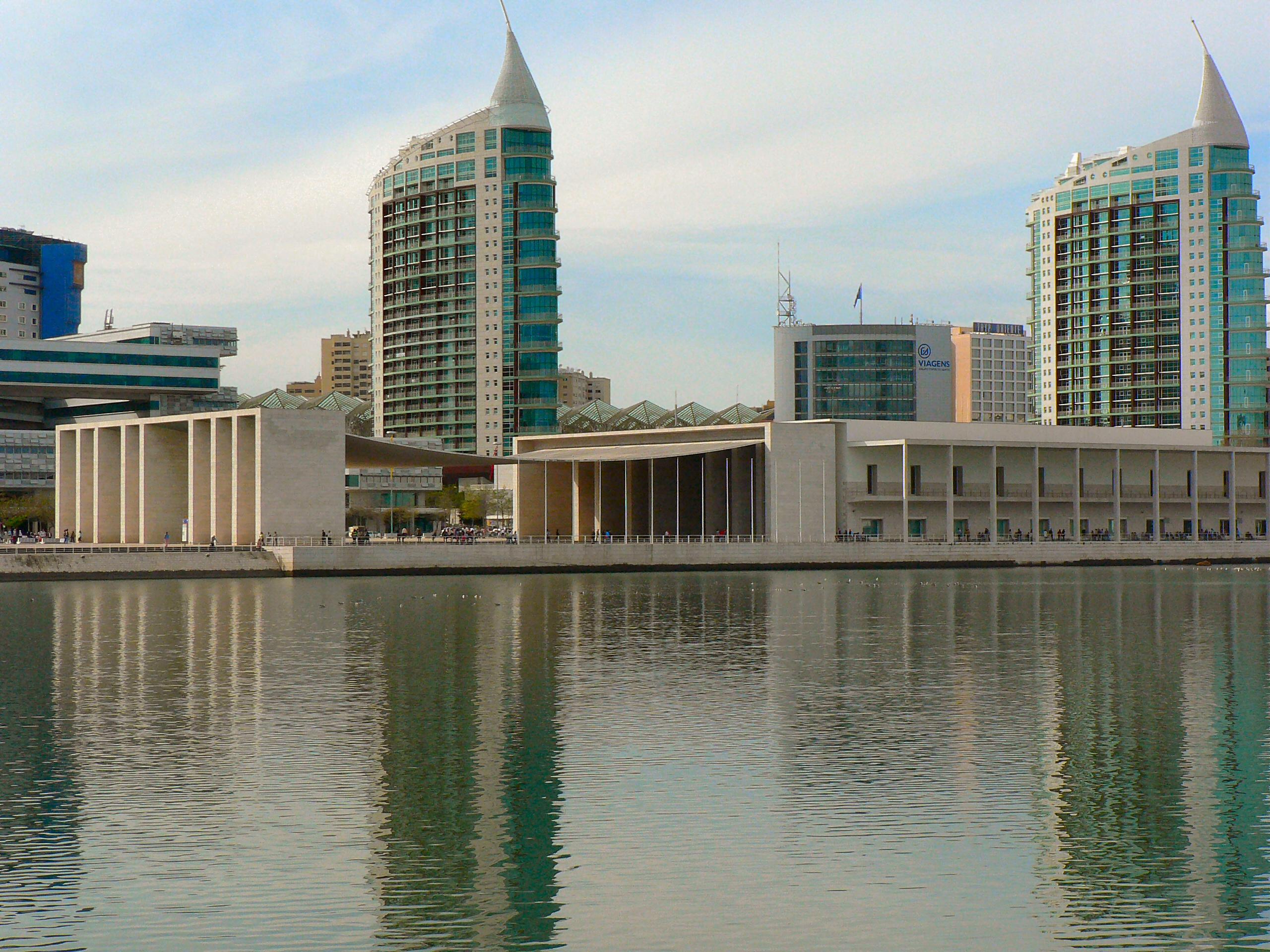
- Main building facade
- Interactive map of the Pavilhão de Portugal area

General information
- Type: Civil architecture
- Architectural style: Contemporary
- Classification: Exhibition pavilion
- Location: Parque das Nações, Lisbon, Portugal
- Coordinates: 38°45′59.61″N 9°5′42.35″W
- Completed: 1998
- Inaugurated: 22 May 1998
- Owner: University of Lisbon

Technical details
- Floor count: 2

Design and construction
- Architect: Álvaro Siza Vieira
- Engineer: António Segadães Tavares
- Awards and prizes: Prémio Valmor
- Known for: Expo '98

Portuguese National Monument
- Criteria: Monument of Public Interest
- Designated: 2010
- Reference no.: 5667074

The Pavilhão de Portugal (In English The Pavilion of Portugal ) is a building located in Alameda dos Oceanos, in Parque das Nações, a civil parish in Lisbon, Portugal.

== History ==
In the World's Fair in 1998 (Expo'98), the building was responsible for housing the Portuguese National representation at that event.

The building's entrance area is a large square covered by an imposing pre-stressed concrete canopy, which is based on the idea of a sheet of paper placed on two bricks, opening up space to the city to accommodate the various events that a space of this kind.

== After Expo ==
After the exhibition, the building was left empty and waiting to be used.

The proposals were varied, from the reuse of the space for a Headquarters of the Council of Ministers, to the creation of an architecture museum.

In March 2015, it was announced in the press that the Portugal Pavilion would be sold, to settle part of Parque Expo's debt to the State.

In May 2015, the Minister of Environment, Spatial Planning and Energy, Jorge Moreira da Silva, announced that the Pavilion was definitively handed over to the University of Lisbon, which was responsible for its maintenance.

The university intends to be very active in areas such as education, scientific research, the promotion of knowledge and the transition to society of the work carried out by the University of Lisbon. The building will now have an auditorium for 600 people, exhibition rooms, offices, meeting rooms and a restaurant.

The contract for the rehabilitation and requalification of the Portugal Pavilion will take place between 2019 and 2021, with a maximum global investment of 9.3 million euros, plus value-added tax.
