= Bonjour Tristesse (building) =

Building in Berlin, Germany

Coordinates: 52°30′00″N 13°26′36″E

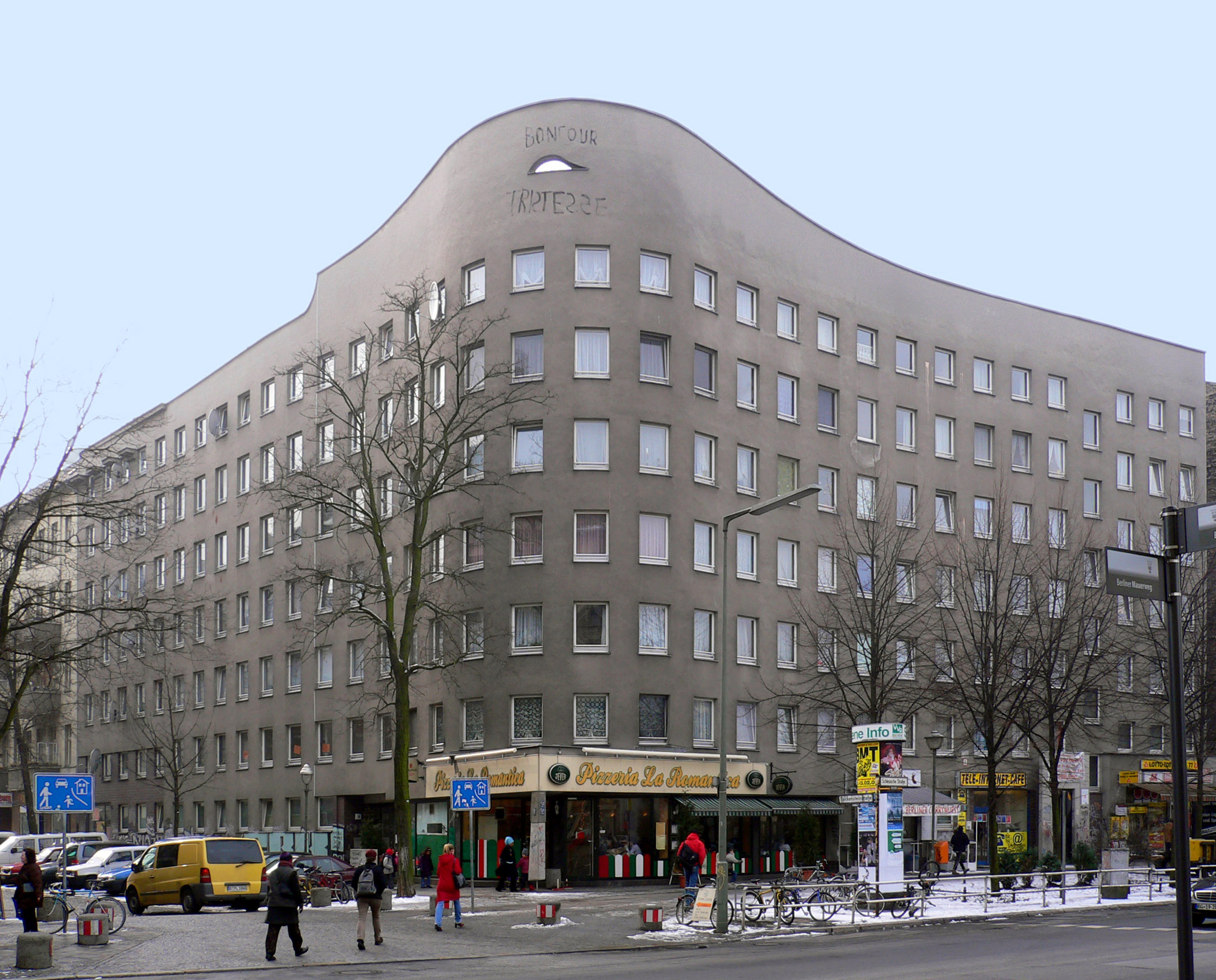

General information
- Type: Residential

Design and construction
- Architect(s): Álvaro Siza Vieira

Bonjour Tristesse (officially referred to as Wohnhaus Schlesisches Tor) is a building in Kreuzberg, a borough of Berlin, designed by architect Álvaro Siza Vieira and completed in 1984. It was the architect's first completed building outside of Portugal. Before the building's construction, the site held several single-story retail stores. The building was constructed as social housing, primarily for Turkish immigrants to Germany. The name of the building translates from French to "Hello Sadness".
