= Kristin Feireiss =

German architectural and curator (1942–2025)

- Born: 1 July 1942; Berlin, Germany
- Died: 20 April 2025 (aged 82)
- Education: Johann Wolfgang Goethe University; Freie Universität Berlin
- Occupation: Architect
- Awards: DAI Literature Prize, Federal Cross of Merit, Order of the Netherlands Lion, honorary doctorate from the Carolo-Wilhelmina Technische Universität in Braunschweig
- Practice: Aedes Architecture Forum

Kristin Feireiss (1 July 1942 – 20 April 2025) was a German architectural and design curator, writer, and editor. Her career included co-founding the Aedes Architecture Forum in Berlin, serving as director of the Netherlands Architecture Institute, and participating as an international juror and commissioner at the Venice Biennale of Architecture. She was known for her role in promoting architecture as a cultural discipline, fostering dialogue between architects and the public, and amplifying the voices of emerging practices.

== Life and career ==
Feireiss was born in Berlin on 1 July 1942. She embarked on a course in Art History at Johann Wolfgang Goethe University in Frankfurt in 1963, and graduated from Freie Universität Berlin in 1967. In the late 1960s, Feireiss began working as a journalist for cultural magazines and radio programs. From 1976 to 1980, she worked at the Internationales Design Zentrum Berlin.

In 1980, she co-founded Aedes in Berlin, an architecture forum that would become one of Europe’s most influential platforms for architectural culture, exhibitions, events, and discourse.

She later served in various capacities for numerous prominent institutions, including:

- Director of the Netherlands Architecture Institute (1996–2001),
- Commissioner of the Dutch Pavilion at the Venice Biennale of Architecture (1996, 2000),
- Member of the International Jury at the Venice Architecture Biennale (2012),
- Juror of the Pritzker Architecture Prize (from 2013),
- Member of the European Cultural Parliament (since 2007).

Feireiss was the author or co-author of numerous publications, including the book Architecture in Times of Need: Make It Right Rebuilding New Orleans’ Lower Ninth Ward, which she co-edited with Brad Pitt.

Feireiss died on 20 April 2025, at the age of 82.

== Honours ==
In 1995, Feireiss received the Literature Prize of the DAI, and on 23 March 2001 was awarded the Federal Cross of Merit.

She was honored as a Knight of the Order of the Netherlands Lion in 2013, and received an honorary doctorate on 26 October 2007 from the Carolo-Wilhelmina Technische Universität in Braunschweig. The university recognized her achievements as a journalist, curator, and founder of the Aedes Architecture Forum, and highlighted her impact as a mediator between academic architectural research and the international public for more than 25 years.

In 2016, she was awarded an Honorary Fellowship by the Royal Institute of British Architects (RIBA).

== Selected works ==
- Kristin Feireiss; Lukas Feireiss: Architecture of change: sustainability and humanity in the built environment. Die Gestalten, Berlin 2008, ISBN 978-3-899-55211-9.
- Kristin Feireiss; Brad Pitt: Architecture in times of need: Make It Right rebuilding New Orleans’ Lower Ninth Ward. Prestel, München 2009, ISBN 978-3-791-34276-4.
- Wie ein Haus aus Karten. Die Neckermanns – meine Familiengeschichte. Ullstein, Berlin 2012, ISBN 978-3-550-08899-5.
