= Senhora da Hora =

Cidade da Senhora da Hora
- Civil parish
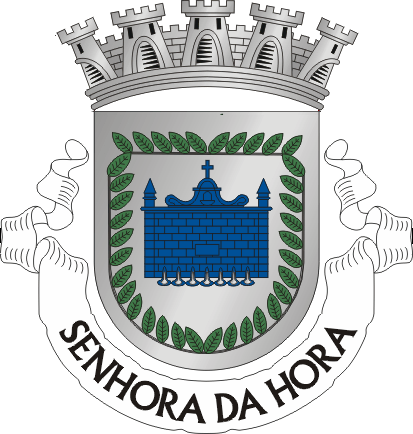
- Coat of arms

- Coordinates: 41.186°N 8.651°W
- Country: Portugal
- Region: Norte
- Metropolitan area: Porto
- District: Porto
- Municipality: Matosinhos

Area
  - Total: 3.80 km^{2} (1.47 sq mi)

Population
  - Total: 29,000
  - Density: 7,600/km^{2} (20,000/sq mi)
- Time zone: UTC+00:00 (WET)
  - Summer (DST): UTC+01:00 (WEST)
- Website: http://www.jf-srahora.pt/

Senhora da Hora (Portuguese pronunciation: [sɨˈɲoɾɐ ðɐ ˈɔɾɐ]) is a civil parish in the municipality of Matosinhos in the Greater Porto area, Portugal. In 2013, the parish merged into the parish São Mamede de Infesta e Senhora da Hora. It was restored in 2025. It was promoted from town (vila) to city (cidade) status on 12 June 2009. It lies just north of the Porto city limits and is densely populated. It is a major suburban habitational area with many houses and some commerce.

Senhora da Hora is very developed and is well connected by road, bus and Porto Metro to the nearby cities of Matosinhos, São Mamede de Infesta, Porto, Maia, Vila do Conde, the Porto Airport (OPO), and the port of Leixões all north of the Douro river. The large developed town of Águas Santas is also in Grande Porto.

== Infrastructures ==
Senhora da Hora is the site of the second-biggest shopping mall in Portugal, NorteShopping with many shops and restaurants. There is also a cinema with eight screens.

A public swimming pool was recently built near NorteShopping inside a small natural park.

The well-known Pedro Hispano Hospital is also located there.

The metropolitan transport service of Porto Metro passes through the centre of Senhora da Hora and the station is one of the most important stops on this public transport system with connections to other lines and road transport.

== Sports ==
Senhora da Hora has sports facilities including small football and basket fields and tennis courts. It also has three football stadiums, home of the local teams, Padroense F.C. and SC Senhora da Hora.

== See also ==
- Porto Metropolitan Area
