= São Mamede de Infesta e Senhora da Hora =

- Civil parish
- Location in Portugal
- Coordinates: 41.19°N 8.61°W
- Country: Portugal
- Region: Norte
- Metropolitan area: Porto
- District: Porto
- Municipality: Matosinhos
- Disbanded: 2025

Area
  - Total: 8.78 km^{2} (3.39 sq mi)

Population (2011)
  - Total: 50,869
  - Density: 5,790/km^{2} (15,000/sq mi)
- Time zone: UTC+00:00 (WET)
  - Summer (DST): UTC+01:00 (WEST)

São Mamede de Infesta e Senhora da Hora is a former civil parish in the municipality of Matosinhos, Portugal. It was formed in 2013 by the merger of the former parishes São Mamede de Infesta and Senhora da Hora. It was disbanded in 2025. The population in 2011 was 50,869, in an area of 8.78 km^{2}.
