= Lavra, Portugal =

Lavra
- Civil parish
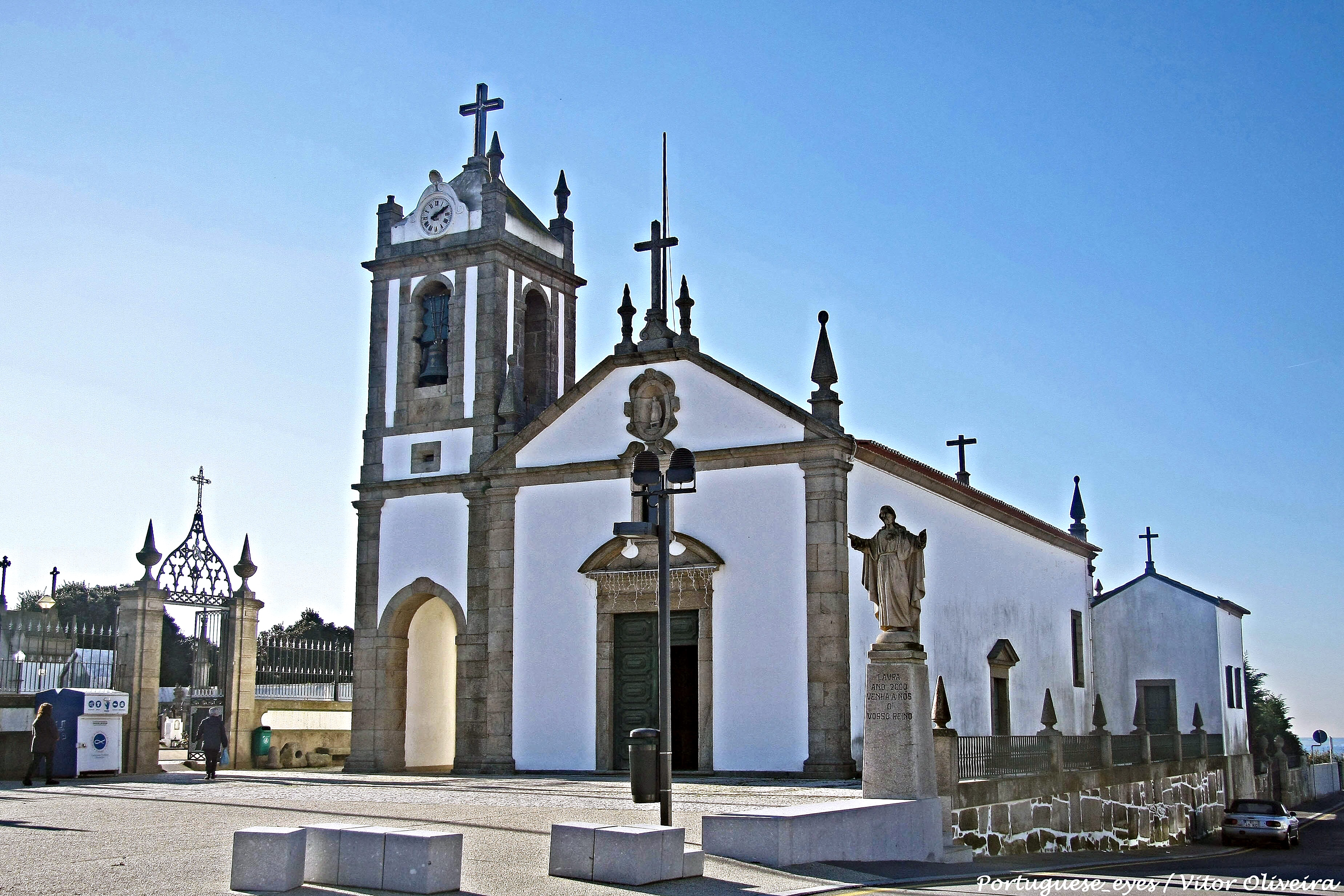

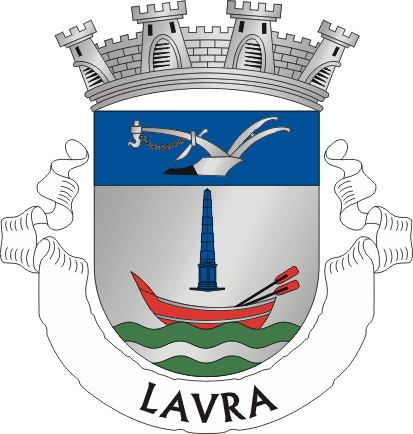
- Coat of arms

- Country: Portugal

Area
  - Total: 10.60 km^{2} (4.09 sq mi)

Population (2011)
  - Total: 10,033
  - Density: 946.5/km^{2} (2,451/sq mi)
- Time zone: UTC+00:00 (WET)
  - Summer (DST): UTC+01:00 (WEST)

Lavra is a Portuguese town in Matosinhos municipality and a civil parish covering an area of 12 square kilometres (4.6 mi^{2}) and with 10,033 inhabitants, as of 2011.

The parish of Lavra was extinct in 2013, due to a national administrative reform, joining with Perafita and Santa Cruz do Bispo parishes to form the Perafita, Lavra e Santa Cruz do Bispo parish. However, the three parishes were restored in 2025. Lavra became a town in 2003.

== Toponym ==
In an hypothesis proposed by Alberto Sampaio in the journal Portugália, the word Lavra may have its roots in La-abra, meaning the inlet, the cove, the small harbor.

== History ==
The human presence in the parish dates back to the 2nd millennium BC, as evidenced by remains of a settlement. Furthermore, a survey from 2004 near the parish church identified settlement remains which may date back from the 3rd milenium BC. There are also remains of megaliths near the parish church and in the locality of Antela, the toponym of which derives from "anta", a word for dolmen. In the inquiries conducted during the compilation of the Parochial Memories of 1758, these funeral monuments are highlighted:

[...] and also because, during the construction of this church, which is itself still of recent date, several large stone tombs were found, of gigantic size in the ancient manner, as well as others made of brick. And while the same church was being built, entire bodies were found in these tombs, reduced to dust, which crumbled away when one blew upon them. I saw this with my own eyes, and I was astonished at the great size of those bodies, for they were gigantic.

During the Iron Age and the Roman period, there were at least two fortified settlements, Angeses and Monte Castro.

Following the Roman conquest, Lavra became integrated in the Roman province of Hispania Tarraconensis. Roman rule introduced a new political, economic, and social order to a territory that had previously been characterized by scattered settlements and communal forms of organization. The Romans established the production of garum and salted fish, a practice confirmed by archaeological evidence. Local toponymy also suggests that Lavra was an important Roman rural settlement, known as villa Labra.

In 1287, it is noted in Catálogo dos Bispos do Porto that the church of Salvador de Lavra belonged to the Benedictines of Santo Tirso Monastery. Some sources mention the existence of a Benedictine monastery of São Salvador de Lavra.

By 1623, the parish of Salvador de Lavra was a commandery of the Order of Christ, and it included 510 people living in communion and 92 minors.

Historical population
Year	Pop.	±%
1864	1,481	—
1878	1,685	+13.8%
1890	1,939	+15.1%
1900	2,164	+11.6%
1911	2,452	+13.3%
1920	2,643	+7.8%
1930	2,950	+11.6%
1940	3,733	+26.5%
1950	4,450	+19.2%
1960	5,064	+13.8%
1970	5,944	+17.4%
1981	7,682	+29.2%
1991	8,894	+15.8%
2001	9,408	+5.8%
2011	10,033	+6.6%
Instituto Nacional de Estatística (General Census)

On 8 July 1832, during the Liberal Wars, the Landing at Mindelo took place at the southern end of the municipality, in Pampelido.

Lavra was under the administration of Leça do Balio until 6 November 1836, when an administrative reform placed Lavra under Bouças municipality, the predecessor to Matosinhos municipality. By then the parish included 300 households.

On 17 July 1856, there was an outbreak of gastroenteritis (cholera morbus) in Bouças municipality, where Lavra was one of the most affected areas. This followed an outbreak of typhoid fever in the parish. The epidemics in Lavra were attributed to the boggy terrain of the parish.

On 3 June 1945, nearly a month after Nazi Germany's surrender in World War II, the crew of a German submarine U-1277 decided to sink it off the coast of Cabo do Mundo. The crew abandoned the submarine on rubber boats and landed in Angeiras, with the assistance of local fishermen. They were transferred to Fort São João Baptista da Foz and thereafter to the United Kingdom, where they were kept as prisoners for three years.

Lavra became a town on 1 July 2003.

== Geography ==
Lavra is the northernmost parish in Matosinhos municipality. It is bathed by the Atlantic Ocean to the west, it is bordered by Vila do Conde municipality to the north, at Onda River, by Maia municipality to the east and by Perafita parish to the south. It includes the localities of Angeiras, Antela, Avilhoso, Cabanelas, Lavra, Paiço, Praia de Angeiras and Pampelido.

Lavra's landscape is largely flat, rising gently from the coastline towards the interior. The most important water course in the parish is the Onda River.

== Landmarks ==
- Angeiras Beach Roman tanks.
- Memória Beach Obelisk, a landmark commemorating the Landing at Mindelo.
- German submarine U-1277, sunk at 30 metres (98 ft) below sea level, 2.5 miles off the coast, which can be visited by diving.
- Museum of Lavra School, an ethnographic museum at José Domingues dos Santos school.
