= Monte Castelo =

Monte Castelo may refer to:

- Castro of Monte Castelo, a Chalcolithic archaeological site in Portugal
- Monte Castelo, São Paulo, Brazil
- Monte Castelo, Santa Catarina, Brazil
- Santa Cruz de Monte Castelo, Paranà, Brazil
- "Monte Castelo" (song) by Brazilian band Legião Urbana

== See also ==
- Battle of Monte Castello
- Montecastello, town in Piedmont, Italy
- Monte Castello di Vibio, town in Umbria, Italy
