= List of saints and beatified people of the Order of Malta =

The following list includes saints of the Catholic Church and those officially beatified by the Church (beati) who belonged to the Sovereign Military Order of Malta.

== Saints ==
- Ubaldesca Taccini, Italian nun
- Flora of Beaulieu, French visionary and Eucharistic mystic
- Nicasius of Sicily, martyr
- Toscana, Italian nun
- Ugo Canefri, Italian crusader

== Blessed ==
- Garcia Martins, administrator of the Order in Portugal
- Clemens August Graf von Galen, Bishop of Muenster
- Gerard of Villamagna, professed member
- Vilmos Apor, Hungarian bishop
- Gerland of Apollonia, knight of the Order
- Adrian Fortescue, martyr
- David Gonson, martyr
- Alfredo Ildefonso Schuster, Archbishop of Milan
- Peter Pattarini of Imola, Italian member of the Order
- Gerard Sasso, founder of the Order
- Charles I of Austria, Austrian emperor

== Related ==
These saints' feast days are celebrated in the Order of Malta:

- Camillus de Lellis, Italian founder
- Elizabeth, mother of John the Baptist
- Zechariah, father of John the Baptist
- Padre Pio, Italian monk
