= Castro of Monte Castelo =

- Castro de Monte Castelo

General information
- Type: Castro
- Architectural style: Calcolithic
- Location: Custóias, Leça do Balio e Guifões, Matosinhos, Portugal
- Opened: 900 BCE
- Owner: Portuguese Republic

Technical details
- Material: Granite

The Castro of Monte Castelo (Portuguese: Povoado fortificado do Monte Castelo de Guifões/Monte Castelo) is a Calcolithic fortified settlement, situated in the civil parish of Custóias, Leça do Balio e Guifões, in the municipality of Matosinhos in the northern Portuguese district of Porto.

== History ==
The oldest archeological artefacts were encountered from 900 B.C.

Evidence suggests that the Castro was inhabited between 5 B.C. and the 5th century.

During the late Middle Age, the locale was re-occupied with the construction of a small castle.

Between the 10th and 11th century, the locality was referenced in the documentation as castrum quiffiones.

In 1878, there were archaeological excavations under the direction of Francisco Martins Sarmento.

At the beginning of the 20th century, new archaeological excavations were undertaken, this time under the direction of Rocha Peixoto. These were followed in the first quarter of the century by surveys by Rui de Serpa Pinto and Mendes Corrêa. These were followed between 1950 and 1960 by excavations by Joaquim Neves dos Santos; and between 1993 and 1994, by Joel Cleto.

In 2016, a campaign of archeological excavations at the Castro, in the course of a protocol established between the Câmara Municipal de Matosinhos and the Department of Sciences and Technical Patrimony by the Faculty of Letters, from the University of Porto, who discovered the ruins of a 1st-century house, a few walls and artefacts from southern Spain, Italy and north Africa.

== Architecture ==
The site is situated on the periphery of Guifões, on the eastern flank of a hilltop overlooking the town, surrounded by pine forests, overlooking the Leça River.

The fortified settlement is defended by three lines of walls. The upper platform is actually used by a shooting range, with constructions and storage rooms. One of the detectable buildings, with a rectangular plan, has a floor of clay and masonry fireplace, whose sill still conserves a decorative twin serpents, which has been interpreted by archaeologist Neves dos Santos as being a sanctuary linked to a funerary cult. The same archaeologist detected another edifice that conserved the base column and respective shaft that suggest a Roman temple.

On the western flank, the area has been excavated, resulting in the unearthing of family homes of circular and rectangular plans, with granite slabs patios. Various layers of wall indicate successive periods of occupation in the locale. During the 1960s, excavations detected rectangular plans, organized in barrios and organized around granite slabs. Near the locale, they discovered a possible ceramic kiln constructed in brick: today little remains. Also, at the base of the hill, in the east, they detected a necropolis, however, it has since been destroyed.

In this location, there existed a medieval castle, and although ceramic assets had been discovered on the site, whatever structure existed could not be discovered.

The upper part of the settlement was completely destroyed by the construction of a firing range, and the installation of the Clube de Caçadores de Matosinhos, while in the east, it was occupied by the urban area. The artefacts discovered on the site, included fragments of Iron Age ceramics, Roman pottery (some painted), amphora, oil lamps, glass, tegula, imbrex, handmills, weights, decoration, escoria, metallic artefacts (handcrafted tools, agricultural implements), numismatics, late Roman ceramics, common and glazed Medieval pottery. The collection is housed in the Soares dos Reis National Museum in Porto, in the Museum of the Anthropology Institute of the Faculty of Sciences of Porto, in the Municipal Museum of Figueira da Foz, and in the Archaeological Office of the Municipality of Matosinhos.
