= She Changes =

Sculpture by Janet Echelman

Coordinates: 41.1734°N 8.6887°W

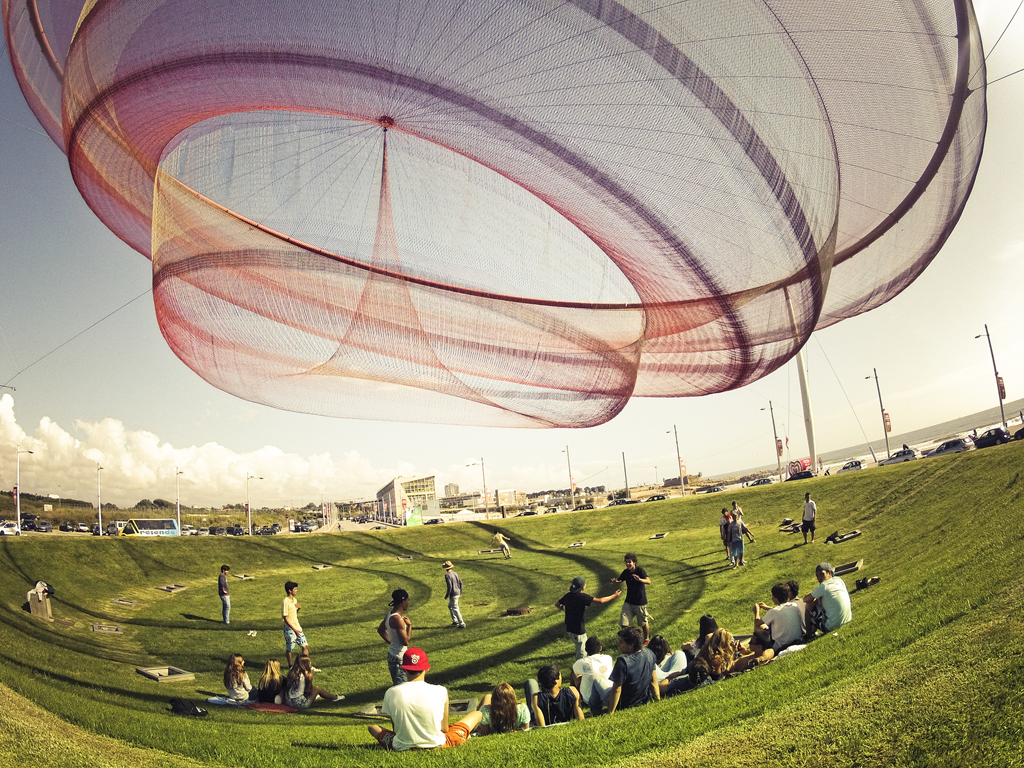
- Artist: Janet Echelman
- Year: 2005
- Type: TENARA architectural fiber (ePTFE)
- Dimensions: 45 m diameter (148 ft)
- Location: Cidade Salvador Plaza; Porto, Portugal

She Changes, known locally as anémona (the anemone), is a sculpture designed by artist Janet Echelman for the cities of Porto and Matosinhos, Northern Portugal. The installation consists of three steel poles, cables, a 20-ton steel ring and a net structure of varying densities and colors. The sculpture is Echelman's first permanent public art installation.

== Design ==
The sculpture is designed to reflect Porto's and Matosinhos's seafaring and industrial heritage. The three support poles are painted to resemble the smokestacks and lighthouses in the area. The net structure is meant to reference the city's fishing industry.

The three support poles range in height from 25–50 m in order to hang the 20-ton, 45 m diameter steel ring at an angle to the ground. The net is woven together from 36 individual sections of varying densities, which give the net its shape. The net material is made of TENARA architectural fiber, a UV-resistant material made of PTFE, Polytetrafluoroethylene.

The netting structure was disassembled for repair in October 2020. The structure was reassembled in April 2021 with new netting. The sculpture weighs approximately 1.5 tonnes.

== Awards ==
- 2005 Americans for the Arts Public Art Network Year in Review
- 2006 Advanced Textiles Association Award of Excellence for Architectural Structures – Other
