= Custóias =

- Civil parish
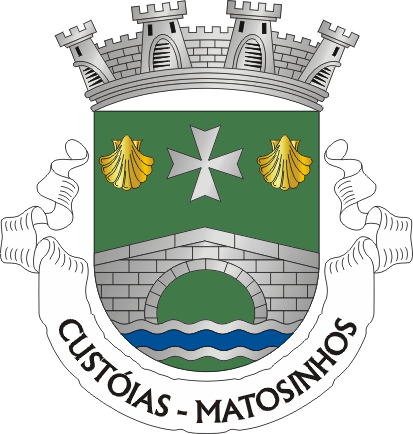
- Coat of arms

- Coordinates: 41.200°N 8.633°W
- Country: Portugal
- Region: Norte
- Metropolitan area: Porto
- District: Porto
- Municipality: Matosinhos

Area
  - Total: 5.78 km^{2} (2.23 sq mi)

Population
  - Total: 18,650
  - Density: 3,230/km^{2} (8,360/sq mi)
- Time zone: UTC+00:00 (WET)
  - Summer (DST): UTC+01:00 (WEST)
- Postal code: 4460
- Website: http://www.jf-custoias-lecabalio-guifoes.pt

Custóias is a civil parish in the municipality of Matosinhos in the Greater Porto area, Portugal. In 2013, the parish merged into the new parish Custóias, Leça do Balio e Guifões, but it was later restored in 2025. Custóias is a town since 2003. The town is 5 kilometres (3.1 mi) from Matosinhos and 8 kilometres (5.0 mi) from Porto.

== Description ==
The town covers an area is 5.78 square kilometres (1,430 acres) and had 18,650 inhabitants in the 2011 census - 9287 men and 9363 women. The area is mainly residential with 7596 family dwellings. The town center is the town square, called Largo do Souto (Souto Square). Custóias hosts a large fair every Saturday near the police station and cemetery.

== Transportation ==
Custóias is served by A4 and VRI motorways. Sociedade de Transportes Colectivos do Porto and Resende provide the bus network. The Porto Metro are Line B and E - Custóias; Line C - Cândido dos Reis and Pias.

== Penitentiary ==
Custóias is home to a state prison that serves the northern region of the country. It received its first prisoners in 1974. The prison accommodation is spread across four pavilions, with individual cells and dormitories. It has a Drug-Free Unit, a security section and a Health Unit, opened in 1997, which provides a range of specialist consultations and hospitalizations.

It also has a multi-purpose sports pitch with a synthetic surface that allows inmates to practice a range of sports, particularly athletics and futsal. The establishment also has a large workshop area, with work and teaching rooms.

The prison population, with a capacity of 686 inmates, is mainly made up of per-trial detainees from Porto, and also houses convicts from the North of the country who are awaiting transfer to prisons serving their sentences.
