= Garcia Martins =

Portuguese saint

Blessed Garcia Martins
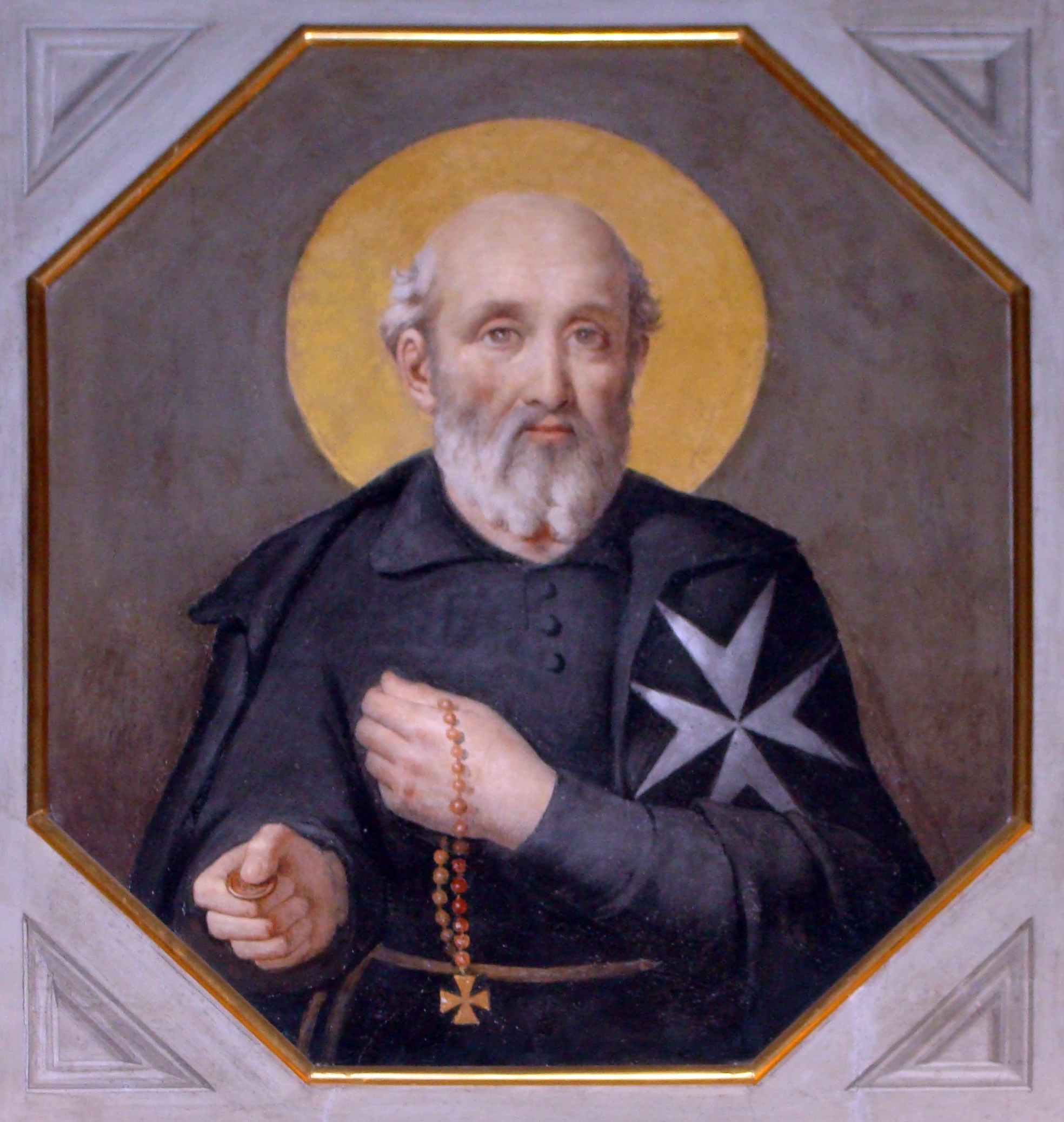
- Blessed Garcia Martins in the chapel of the Magistral Palace, Via dei Condotti, Rome

Bailiff
- Died: January 1306; Leça, Portugal
- Major shrine: Monastery of Saint Mary of Leça
- Feast: 3 January

Frei Dom Garcia Martins, (Note: European Portuguese pronunciation: [ɡɐɾˈsi.ɐ mɐɾˈtĩʃ]) also rendered as García Martínez (d. January 1306), was a medieval Portuguese Knight of the Order of the Hospital of Saint John of Jerusalem, and an important administrator of the Order in Portugal and the Iberian Peninsula.

He is venerated as a Blessed in the Roman Catholic Church; excluding Saint Nuno of Saint Mary, he is the only Portuguese in the sanctorale of the Order of Malta.

== Life ==
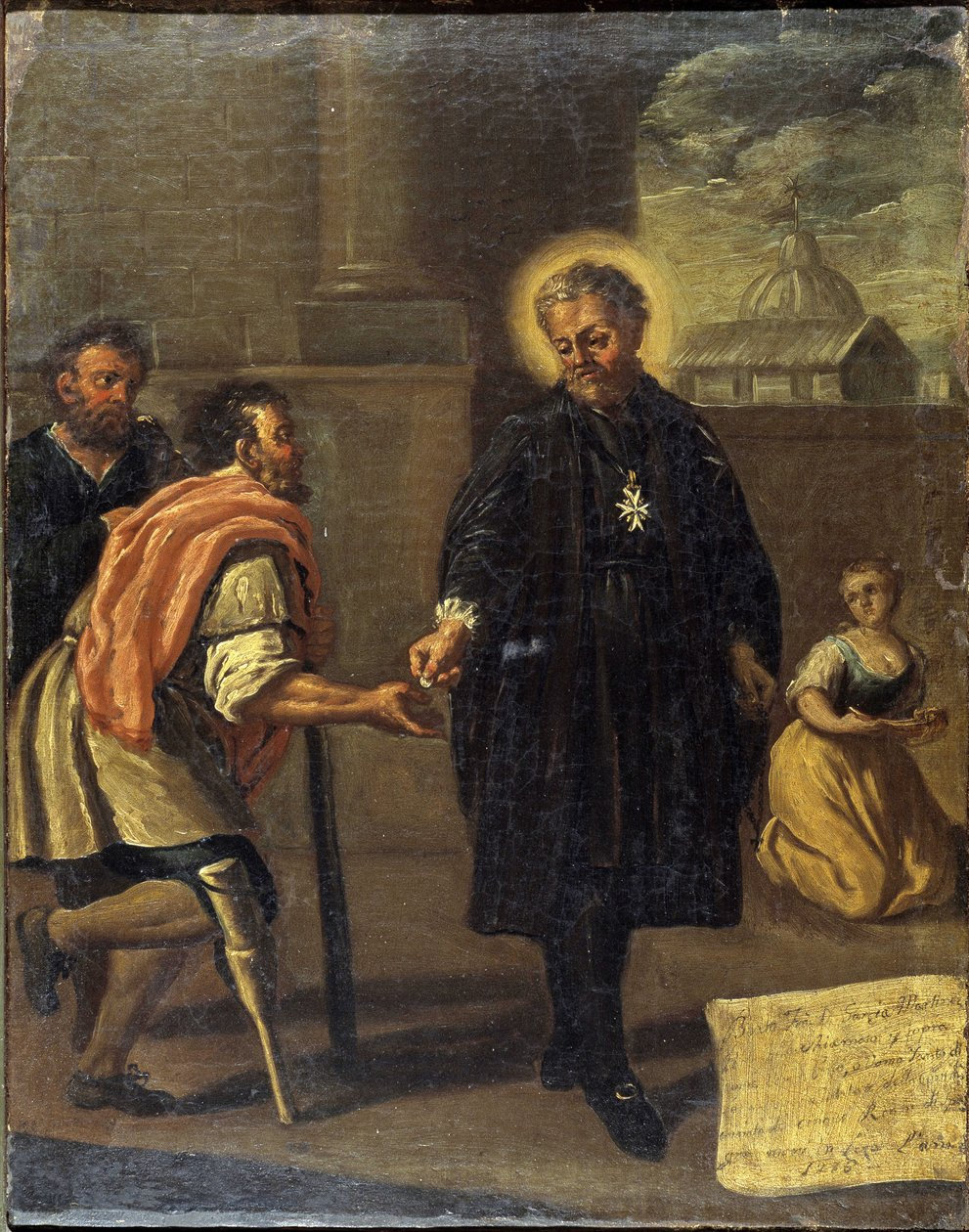
Blessed Garcia Martins, early 18th-century Neapolitan school; National Museum of Art, Valetta

Surprisingly little is known about the life of Garcia Martins. One of his biographers tentatively gives his place of origin as São Martinho de Mouros, in Resende.

From available records, it is known that he was the commander of Faia (probably Faia, Cabeceiras de Basto) in 1277. In 1289, as the lieutenant of the Prior, he was charged with receiving goods donated by the bastard daughter of King Afonso III and widow of the powerful Gonçalo Garcia de Sousa, Leonor Afonso. That same year, he becomes Prior, the top of the hierarchy of the Knights Hospitaller in Portugal: he would serve two periods in that post, 1289 to 1291 (the year he became commander of Leça), and 1299 to 1303. In 1302, he was Prior as well as commander of Santarém.

In 1303, he became Grand Commander of the five Iberian kingdoms (encompassing Portugal, León, Navarre, Aragon and Castile).

Garcia Martins died in January 1306, as recorded in the ledger stone on the lid of his tomb chest monument in the Monastery of Saint Mary of Leça:

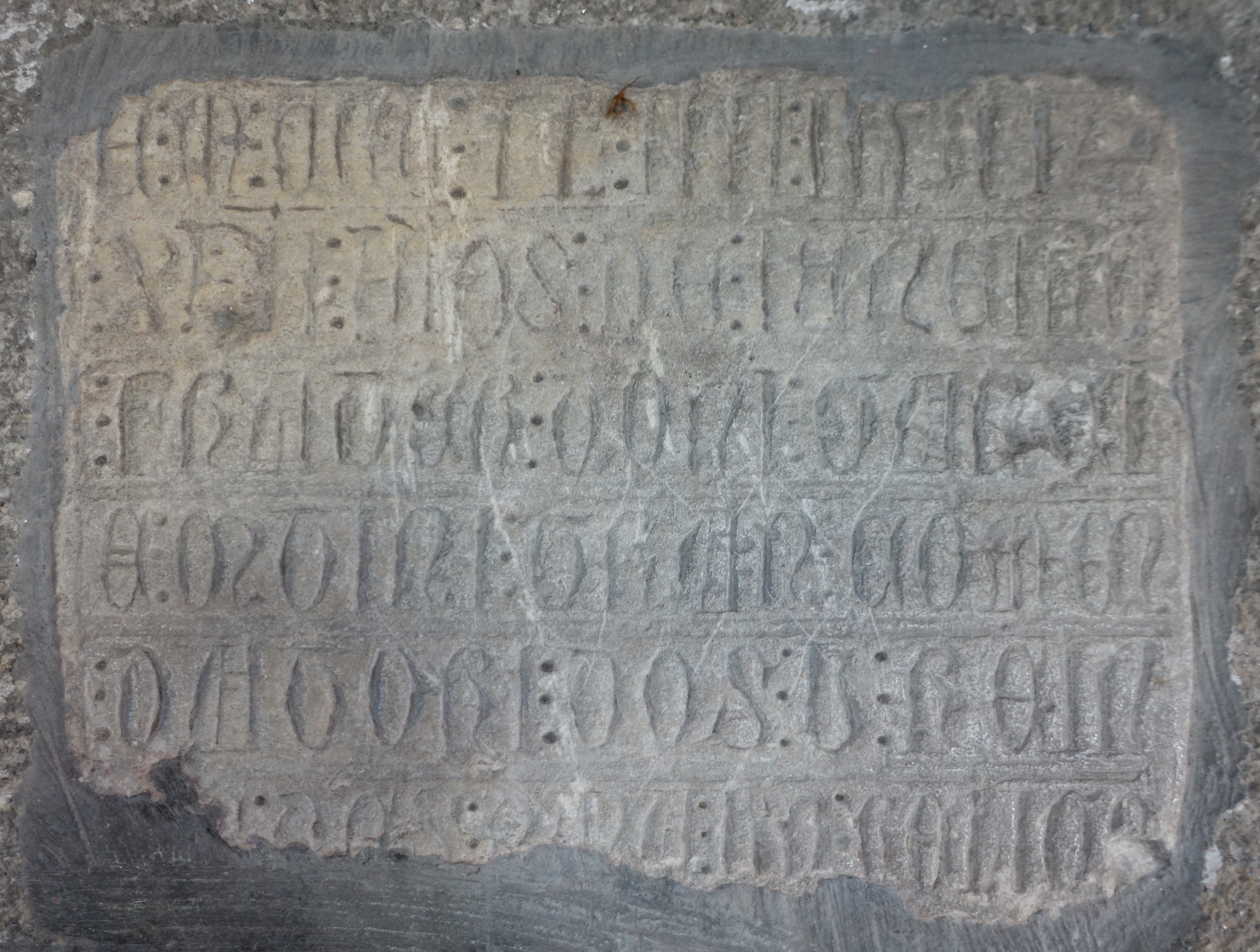
The medieval inscription on the tomb of Blessed Garcia Martins

E ⋮ M ⋮ CCC ⋮ XL ⋮ IIII ⋮ INIESU
⋮ CHRISTI ⋮ FIDE ⋮ DECESSITE ⋮ IANEIRO
⋮ FRATER ⋮ DONI ⋮ GARCI
E ⋮ MARTINI ⋮ GRAN ⋮ COMEN
⋮ DATORI ⋮ DOS ⋮ U ⋮ REIN
OS ⋮ DES ⋮ PANA ⋮ IN ⋮ RELIGO (Note: "In Era 1344 [AD 1306], in the faith of Jesus Christ, died in the month of January, Frei Dom Garcia Martins, Grand Commander of the Five Kingdoms of Spain in the Religion.")

== Legacy ==
Garcia Martins died with a reputation for sanctity, being referred to as "the Blessed Man" ("o Homem Santo"), and his tomb in the Monastery of Saint Mary of Leça soon became a place of pilgrimage. The medieval granite tomb chest is extant: it rests on three stone lions, and there is a coeval funeral inscription on the gabled lid — this small ledger stone covers up a window-like opening that allowed for the public veneration of Blessed Garcia Martins's remains.

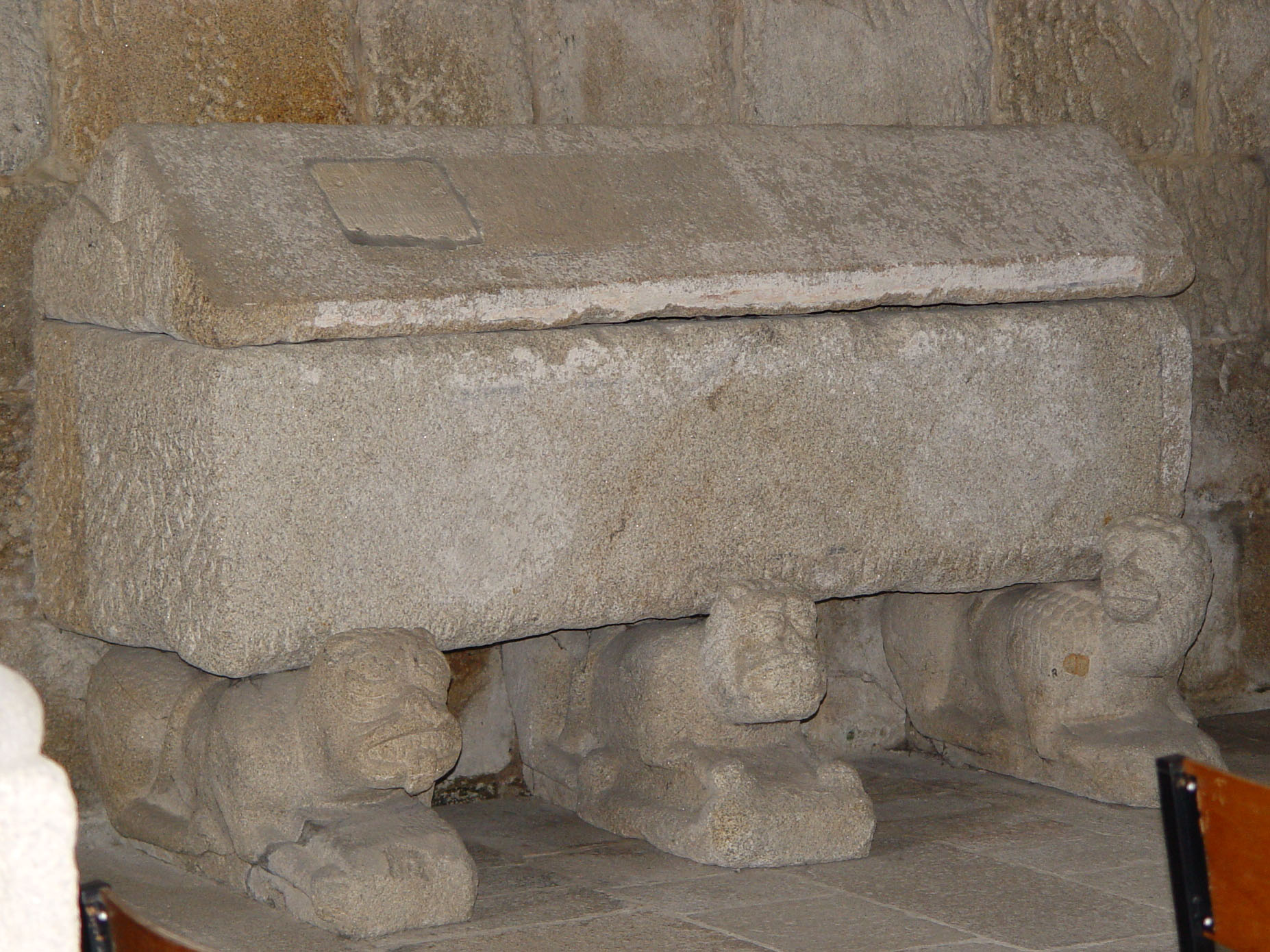
The tomb of Blessed Garcia Martins in the Monastery of Saint Mary of Leça

The tomb was at first placed in the old sacristy and remained there for nearly three-hundred years. On 1 May 1598, as described in Fr. Jorge Cardoso's Agiológio Lusitano (1666), the tomb was opened for the first time: the body was discovered to be incorrupt, still dressed in the robes of the Knights Hospitaller, and exuding a gentle aroma. After a few days of public veneration, it was noted that his beard grew considerably, as did his toenails, dislodging his leather shoes from his feet. The tomb was then moved to the middle of the church. It is currently located on the church's aisle on the Gospel side of the nave; writing in 1852, António do Carmo Velho de Barbosa (1789–1854) says it had been moved to that location "some forty years ago, more or less". When the tomb was opened then, all there was to be seen was bones and a great deal of rosary beads that had fallen inside the tomb presumably when pilgrims attempted to pass them through the opening on the lid to make them contact relics. By the 1850s, Velho de Barbosa describes the monument as having been nested in "a kind of painted wooden cabinet" that concealed its base and the stone lions.

There are two miracles associated with Blessed Garcia Martins that are particularly remembered because of their spectacularity. When, in the summer of 1490, Philippa of Coimbra, daughter of Infante Peter, Duke of Coimbra and granddaughter of King John I of Portugal, went on a pilgrimage to Santiago de Compostela, she stopped with all her entourage in Monastery of Moreira to venerate the True Cross, and in Leça do Balio to venerate the relics of Blessed Garcia Martins; as soon as she left the city, a cripple followed her example and dragged himself to the tomb of Blessed Garcia Martins to pray and was healed. He ran to meet the entourage to everyone's amazement, and Philippa returned to the monastery and remained in prayer there for nine days. Another miracle concerned a blacksmith from Leça who, having put stock in gossip, began to suspect that his wife had failed her wedding vows. The desperate wife invoked the Blessed Garcia Martins and, as proof of her innocence, she offered to take in her hand a red-hot ploughshare from the flames of the forge, and she went quietly to place it beside the tomb of the Blessed; after seeing his wife's fingers miraculously intact, the husband had to acknowledge his mistake. 17th-century accounts still describe the ploughshare as laying by the tomb of Blessed Garcia Martins.

Both the cited Velho de Barbosa in 1854 and José Anastácio de Figueiredo (1766–1805) in 1800 (in his Nova História da Militar Ordem de Malta) attest to the popular persistence of the cultus of Blessed Garcia Martins well into the 19th century: they describe the votive offerings and wax ex-votos the faithful left beside his tomb.
