= Fort of Leça da Palmeira =

- Forte de Leça da Palmeira
- Porto, Greater Porto, Norte in Portugal
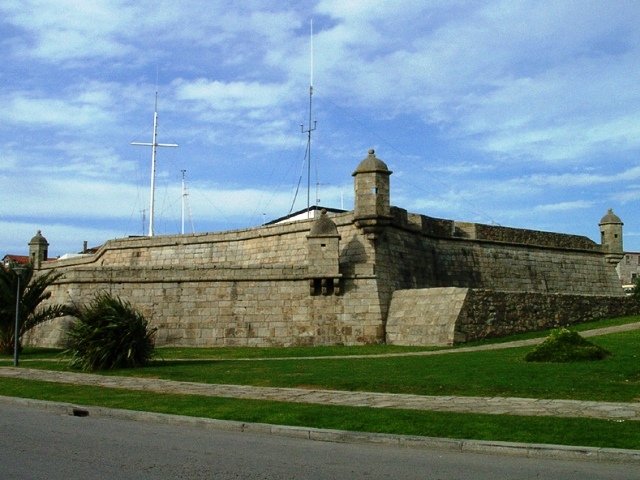
- The tiered battlements of the Forte de Leça de Palmeira

Site information
- Type: Fort
- Owner: Portuguese Republic
- Operator: Captaincy of the Port of Leixões; Ministério da Defesa Nacional/Marinha
- Open to the public: Public

Location
- Coordinates: 41°11′15.40″N 8°42′8.19″W

Site history
- Built: c. 1720
- Built by: António Vieira
- Architect: João Turriano
- In use: c. 1701 - c. 1844
- Materials: Granite, Masonry, Wood, Tile

The Fort of Leça da Palmeira (Portuguese: Forte de Leça da Palmeira), also known as Castle of Matosinhos (Portuguese: Castelo de Matosinhos) or Fort of Our Lady of the Snows (Portuguese: Forte de Nossa Senhora das Neves) is a coastal fortification located in Leça da Palmeira, Matosinhos in the Greater Porto region of Portugal. Built between 1652 and 1720 to replace an earlier fortification, it formed part of the defensive system at the mouth of the Douro River. Since the 1844, the fort has served administrative and maritime functions and it now hosts Captaincy of the Port of Leixões and the local maritime police command.

== History ==
The first fortification called Fort of Our Lady of the Snows, was located in the nearby area of Santa Catarina. It was commissioned in 1638 by Francisco de Sá de Meneses, Count of Penaguião, with the assistance of Captain António Francisco Chorão. Its purpose was to reinforce the defenses at the mouth of the Douro River in conjunction with the Fort of São Francisco Xavier do Queijo and the Fort of São João da Foz, providing protection for local populations against pirates and privateers from the Mediterranean, Africa and other regions. The fort's original name is traditionally attributed to a ship named Senhora das Neves, after a Marian devotion of the same name. This ship transported a statue of Our Lady of the Conception from Coimbra to Leça da Palmeira in 1483.

Construction of the first fort progressed slowly, despite a 1639 order by King Philip III for it to be completed and armed. Following the outbreak of the Portuguese Restoration War in 1640, the completion of the project became a priority, to protect the local populations from Castilian attacks. In 1642, the municipal council of Porto petitioned King John IV to expedite its conclusion, and by royal decree the works were to be financed by the city treasury. The construction continued only in 1646, and two years later the first garrison of six soldiers was established by royal order, although the fort remained incomplete.

By 1651, the first fort was deemed of little strategic value by the municipal authorities of Porto, as it lay too far from the cove. A year later, a new and more substantial fortification was designed by friar João Turriano, chief engineer of the kingdom, with António Vieira contracted as master mason in 1655. This second fort became the main structure still visible today. By 1701, this new fort housed a larger garrison, artillery positions, and four cannons, and it was likely completed around 1720, a date inscribed on the base of the main central arch. The earlier fort was gradually abandoned and damaged by floods and tides. Its ruins were sold in 1851, and later, some of its remains were incorporated into the Hotel Estefânia. This hotel was eventually expropriated to make way for Dock 1 of the Port of Leixões.

During the Liberal Wars, around 1832, the fort received improvements to its warehouses, drawbridge, internal staircase and parapets. A few years later, it lost its military function with the withdrawal of the garrison, and in 1844 the main square was repurposed to house Porto's customs office.

In 1892, the fort became the seat of the Captaincy Maritime Delegation of the Douro Port, later renamed to Captaincy of the Port of Leixões, with the installation of a mast for signaling. In the early 20th century, a signal tower was built on the upper platform to monitor maritime traffic. A pilot lookout operated from the fort until 1965, when operations were transferred to the new pilot station.

It was classified as a Property of Public Interest in 1961, and in the following year a landscaping project was completed by Ilídio de Araújo, improving the grounds and surrounding area.

== Architecture ==
The fort is located approximately 8 metres (26 ft) above sea level along the urban shoreline of Leça da Palmeira, implanted in front of the Port of Leixões, and encircled by homes and residences.

The fort is a typical design in the form of a star pattern, with four points, protected by angular curtain wall and barbicans. The fort still has some cannons along its battlements. Apart from a few dependencies associated with its service as fortification, the rest of the interior is occupied by constructions uncharacteristic of this service, constructed to service the Captaincy of the Porto Leixões, including aerials, communications antennas and service buildings.
