= Museum of Lavra School =

Ethnographical museum in Lavra

The Museum of Lavra School is an ethnographical museum located in Lavra, Portugal.

The museum displays objects which were common in the 19th century to the beginning of the 20th century and characterizes the way of life of the population of the village in those ancient times. The museum is organized according to the production cycles and experiences. It starts with the country house, which was the basis of all social structure, and then presents all the set of patent cores in the museum collection.

== The country house ==
The country house is a unit composed by three elements: the built part, the productive complex and the family. People are identified by the house they own, which also defines the social status. The status implies obligations and duties, as well as obtained benefits on the use of what is common, such as water and wastelands.

== The rural kitchen ==
In the country house, the kitchen is the place where all the family life happens. The kitchen can be a ground or a wooden compartment, forming a separated room. Here we can find the fireplace, receive who comes for a visit and prepare and have meals in family or with those who work for the house. In the fireplace the boilers with meat are kept and, in the oven, bread baking is weekly prepared. Around the fireplace, surrounded by heat and light, people spent the evenings, spinning linen or wool, while listening to songs and telling stories.

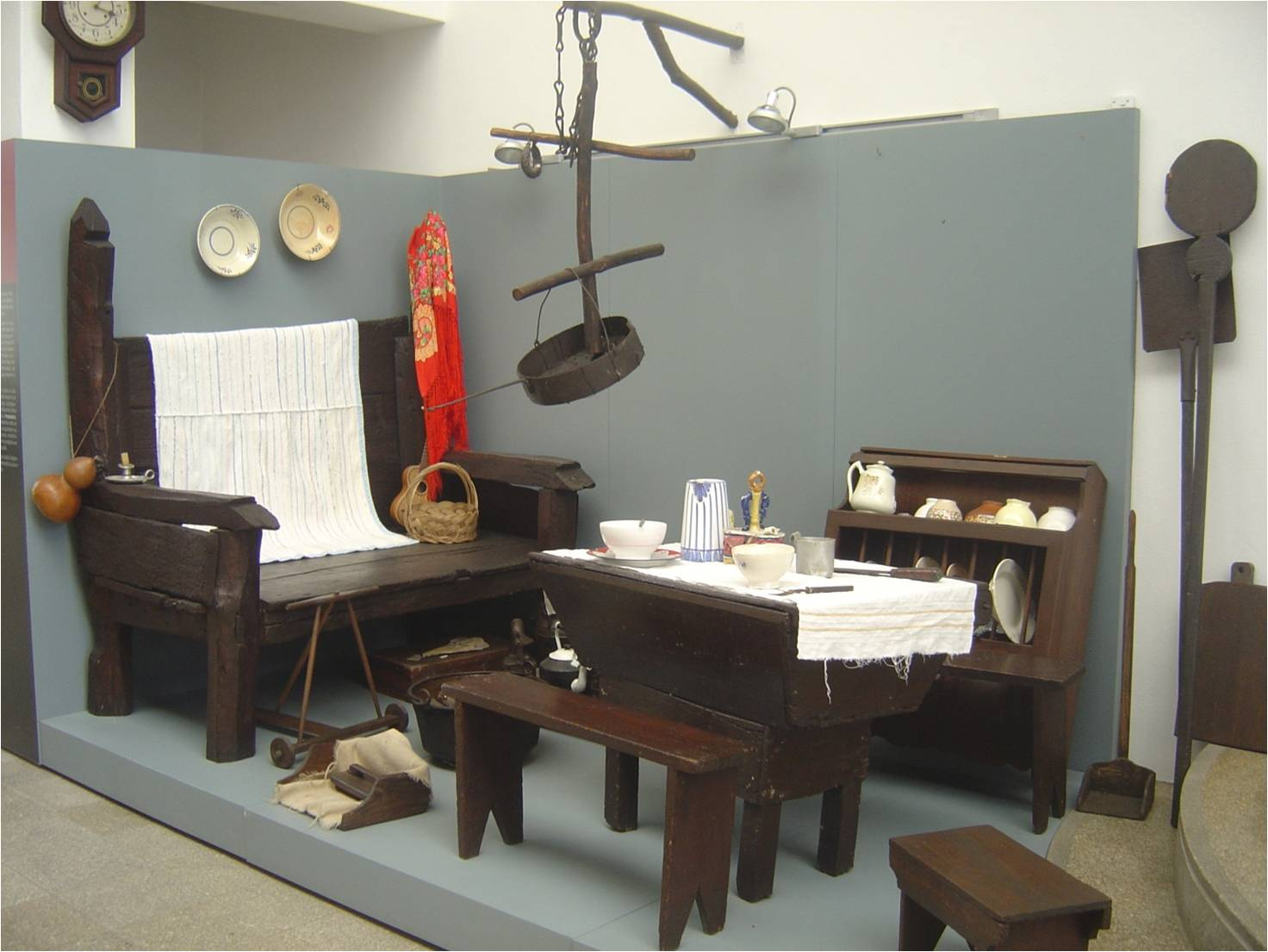
The rural kitchen

== The farmyard ==
Sometimes isolated, this home is structured to meet the needs of exploring the farm. It may consist of buildings arranged around a central space, patio, made up by housing, livestock, pigsty, chicken coop, rabbit hutches and stores where farm implements and crops are kept and where there is the mill, the winery and the distillery. The farmyard is the farming space, where are the oxen cars, the cereals cleaner, the seed drill and the agricultural implements.

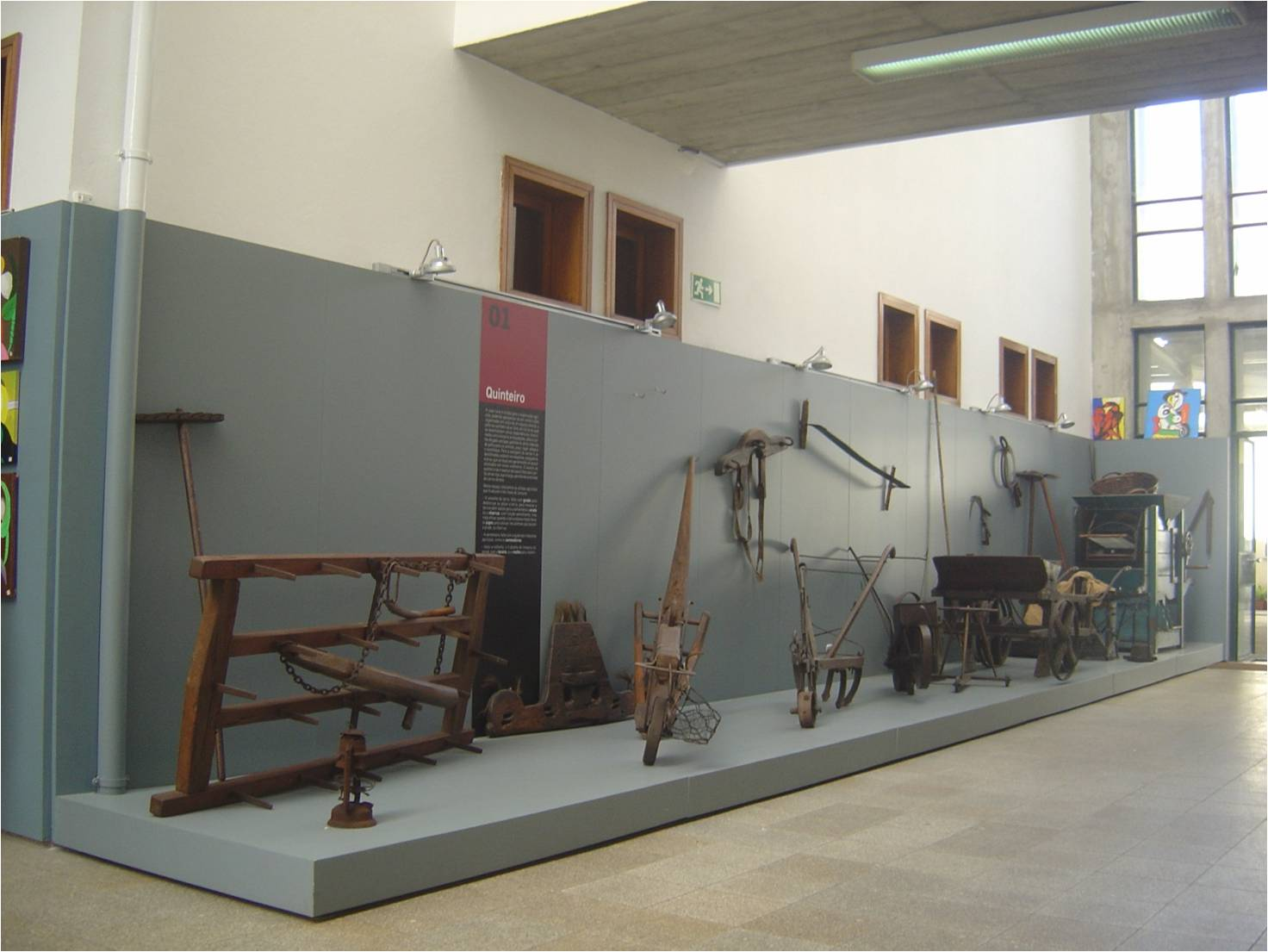
The farmyard

== The linen cycle ==
The linen should be sown in March, in the beginning of the Spring season. In the Summer, the harvest is done – people pull out the linen, to make good use the textile fiber, which is found in the stalk. Then, we must hackle the linen, which consist of taking of the seed with the “ripo” (a comb made of iron). The next action is to soak – the linen stays for two weeks in current but not very strong water. Then, it will dry in a previously cut and cleaned field. The linen balls are placed on the field. Once dry, the linen is scutched. This action is made in “espadeladouro”, with a flax-comb (a wooden board and a hive (cylinder made of cork). The purpose is to separate the fibres. The linters are taken out (rough, thick and short fibre, which is also used to make some kind cloth, like mattress liners, kitchen rags and flour sacs). The fibre that remains, after the separation of the linters, is put in a machine, which repeatedly tramples the linen in the river. The linen can also be made with a maul. In this way the linen is squeezed. Now it is time to go to the next step, which consists of putting the fibre that remained in a machine that softens the linen and makes it glossy, separating the linen from the cotton waste (that remains trapped inside the machine making the linen become finer). The linen is now ready to be sharpened. For its spinning, the distaff and the spinning wheel are used, turning the fibre into thread.

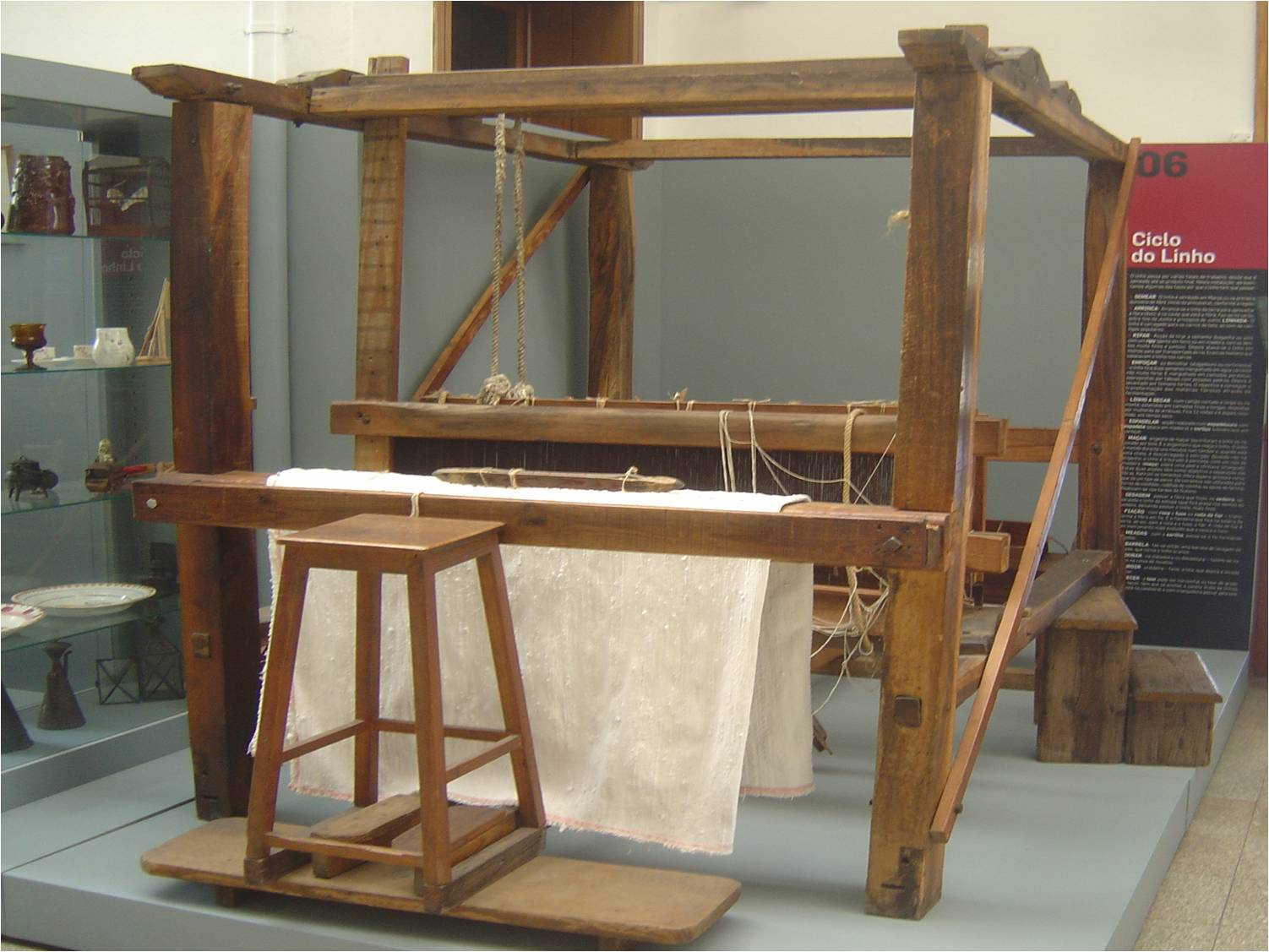
Loom

== The craftsmanships ==
=== The blacksmith ===
One of the most popular crafts in Lavra was blacksmithing craft. Nowadays, there are few blacksmiths who still work with traditional forge and are usually old people. This craftsmanship, as most of the offices in the old times, was transmitted from parents to children. It was an activity that was perpetuated in the family with obvious advantages: there were workshops and tools, requiring no additional investments. Only the art of knowing how to do... Nowadays, that art is a thing of the past as industrialization has replaced the small craftsmanship.

=== The miller ===
The cereal mill, another structure once essential and widely used in Lavra, was generally of collective use and was near a watercourse, as for example, near the rio Onda.

=== Fishing ===
Fishing is another traditional activity strongly established in Lavra. As a complement to the agricultural activity, the people of the household participated in this activity, either directly or indirectly: the fishermen, the gulfweeth gatherer, the carters, jobs done by women and other family members. This was a very strong religious activity.

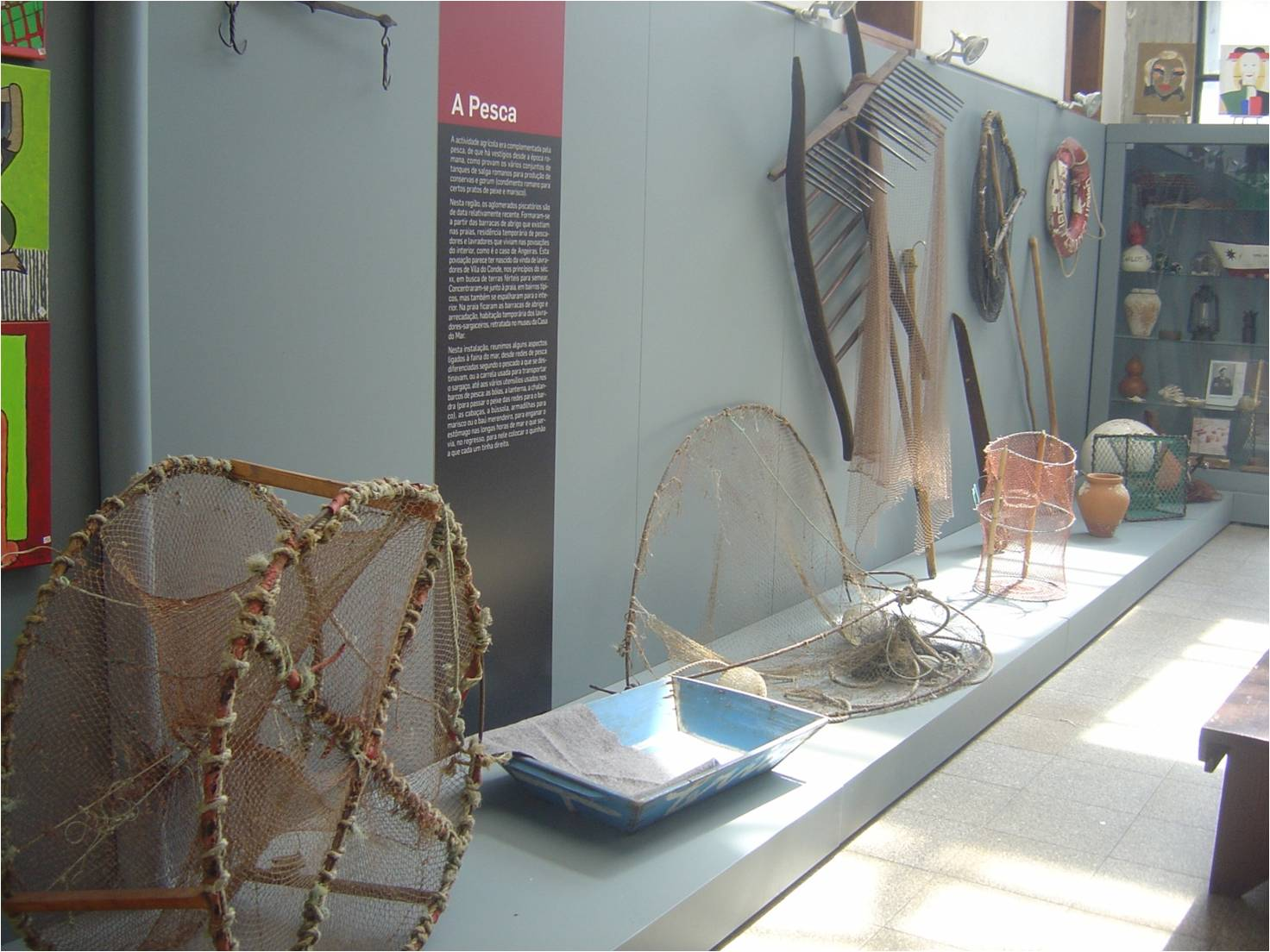
Fishing tackle
