= Perafita, Lavra e Santa Cruz do Bispo =

- Civil parish
- Location in Portugal
- Coordinates: 41.224°N 8.698°W
- Country: Portugal
- Region: Norte
- Metropolitan area: Porto
- District: Porto
- Municipality: Matosinhos
- Disbanded: 2025

Area
  - Total: 22.65 km^{2} (8.75 sq mi)

Population (2011)
  - Total: 29,407
  - Density: 1,298/km^{2} (3,363/sq mi)
- Time zone: UTC+00:00 (WET)
  - Summer (DST): UTC+01:00 (WEST)

Perafita, Lavra e Santa Cruz do Bispo was a civil parish in the municipality of Matosinhos, Portugal. It was formed in 2013 by the merger of the former parishes Perafita, Lavra and Santa Cruz do Bispo, but it was dissolved in 2025. The population in 2011 was 29,407, in an area of 22.65 square kilometres (8.75 mi^{2}). It is crossed by the A28 (Porto / Valença). The Porto Airport is situated in its territory.
