= São Mamede de Infesta =

- Civil parish
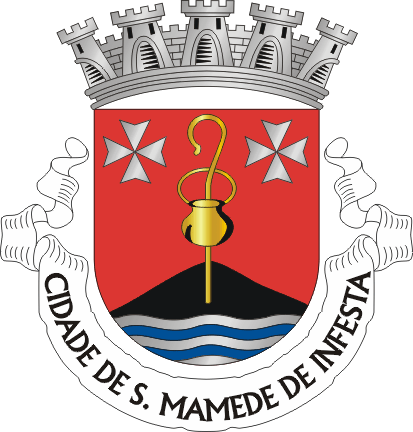
- Coat of arms

- Coordinates: 41°12′N 8°36′W
- Country: Portugal
- Region: Norte
- Metropolitan area: Porto
- District: Porto
- Municipality: Matosinhos

Area
  - Total: 5.21 km^{2} (2.01 sq mi)

Population
  - Total: 23,122
  - Density: 4,440/km^{2} (11,500/sq mi)
- Time zone: UTC+00:00 (WET)
  - Summer (DST): UTC+01:00 (WEST)
- Postal code: 4465-268

São Mamede de Infesta, or simply São Mamede, is a civil parish in the municipality of Matosinhos in the Greater Porto area, Portugal. In 2013, the parish merged into the new parish São Mamede de Infesta e Senhora da Hora. It was restored in 2025. It has a population of approximately 28,000 inhabitants and is located just north of the city of Porto.
