= Custóias, Leça do Balio e Guifões =

Parish in the municipality of Matosinhos, Portugal

- Civil parish
- Location in Portugal
- Coordinates: 41.20°N 8.63°W
- Country: Portugal
- Region: Norte
- Metropolitan area: Porto
- District: Porto
- Municipality: Matosinhos
- Disbanded: 2025

Area
  - Total: 18.84 km^{2} (7.27 sq mi)

Population (2011)
  - Total: 45,716
  - Density: 2,427/km^{2} (6,285/sq mi)
- Time zone: UTC+00:00 (WET)
  - Summer (DST): UTC+01:00 (WEST)

Custóias, Leça do Balio e Guifões was a civil parish in the municipality of Matosinhos, Portugal. It was formed in 2013 by the merger of the former parishes of Custóias, Leça do Balio and Guifões, but it was dissolved in 2025. The population in 2011 was 45,716, in an area of 18.84 square kilometres (7.27 mi^{2}).
