= Matosinhos =

- Municipality
- City of Matosinhos
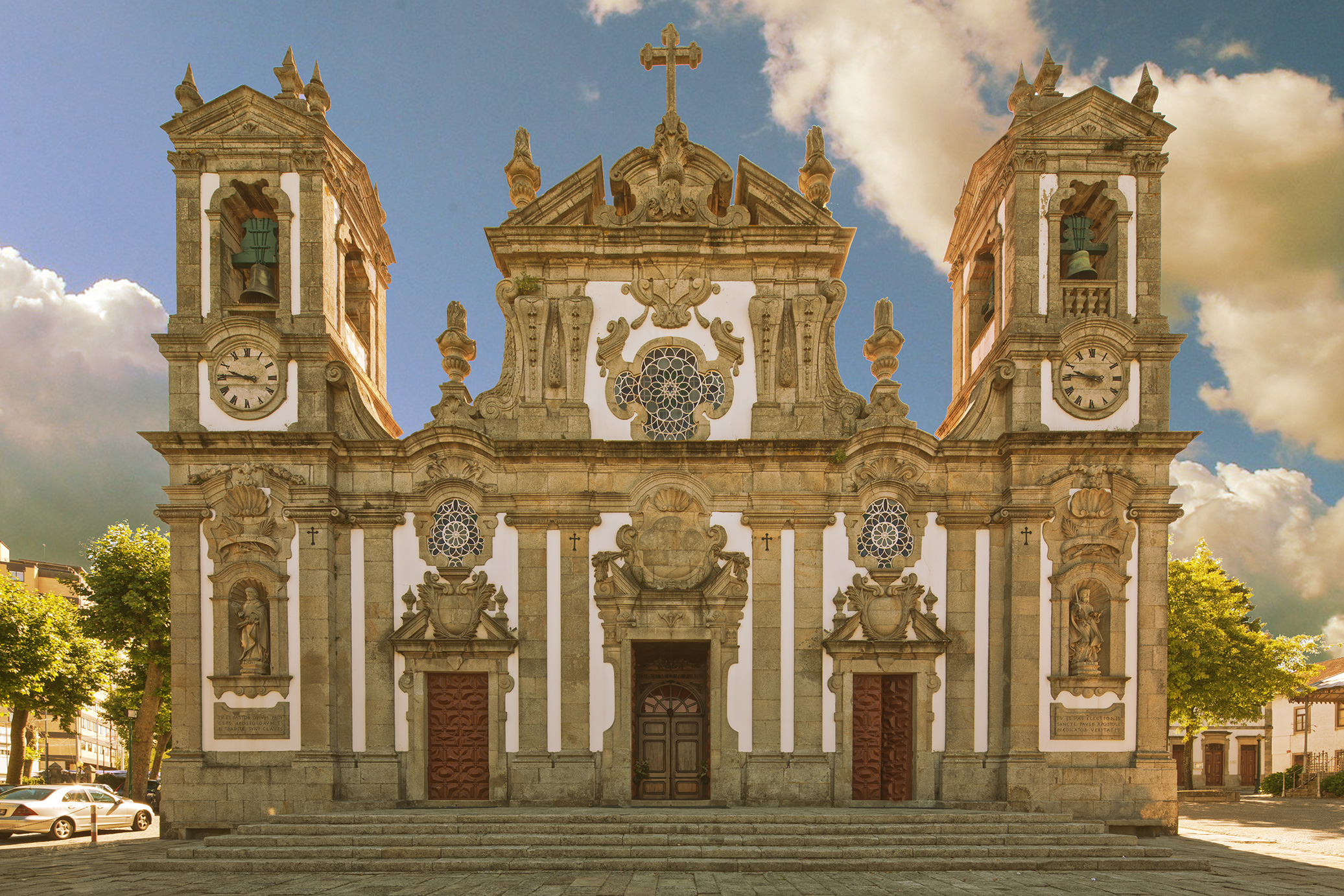
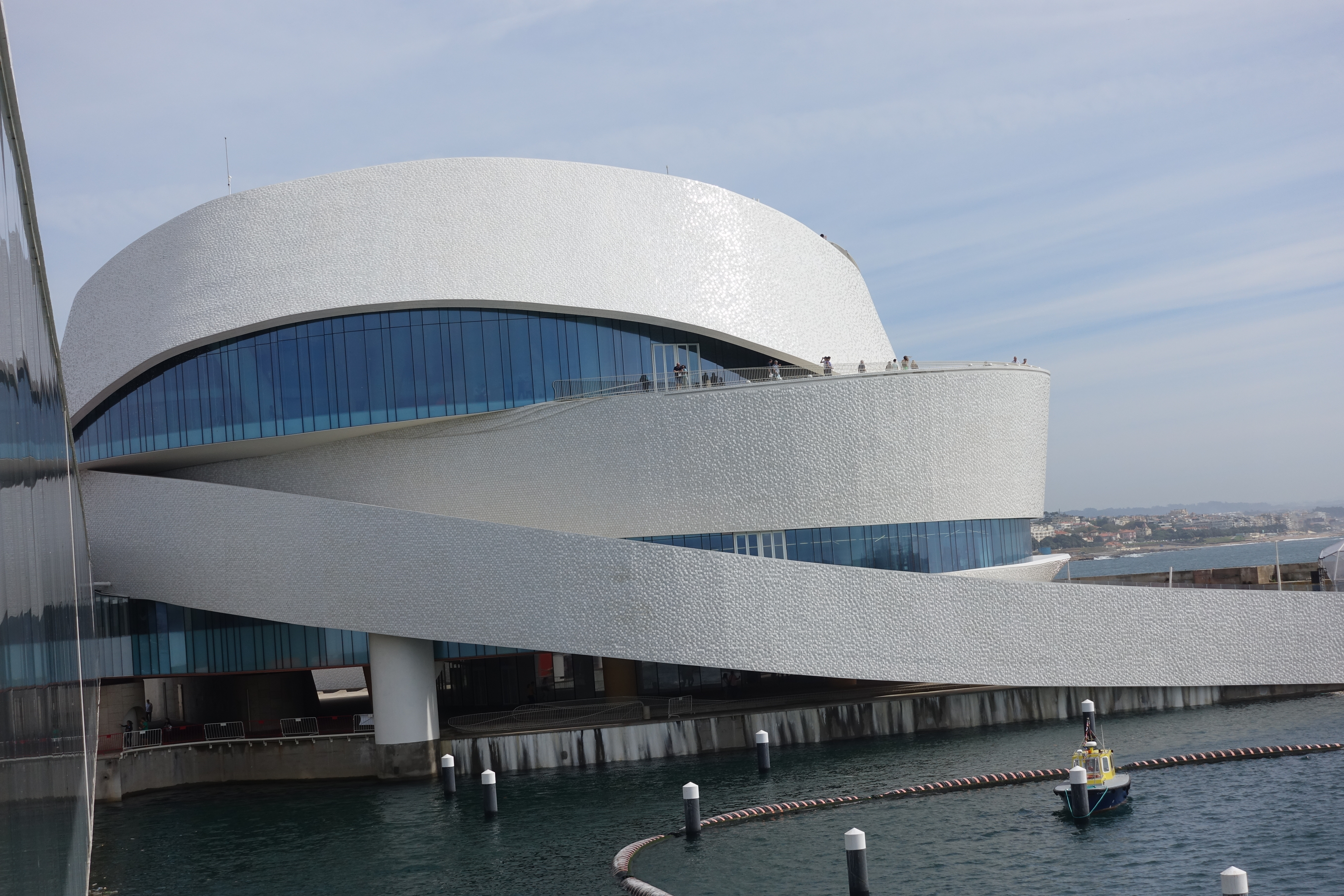
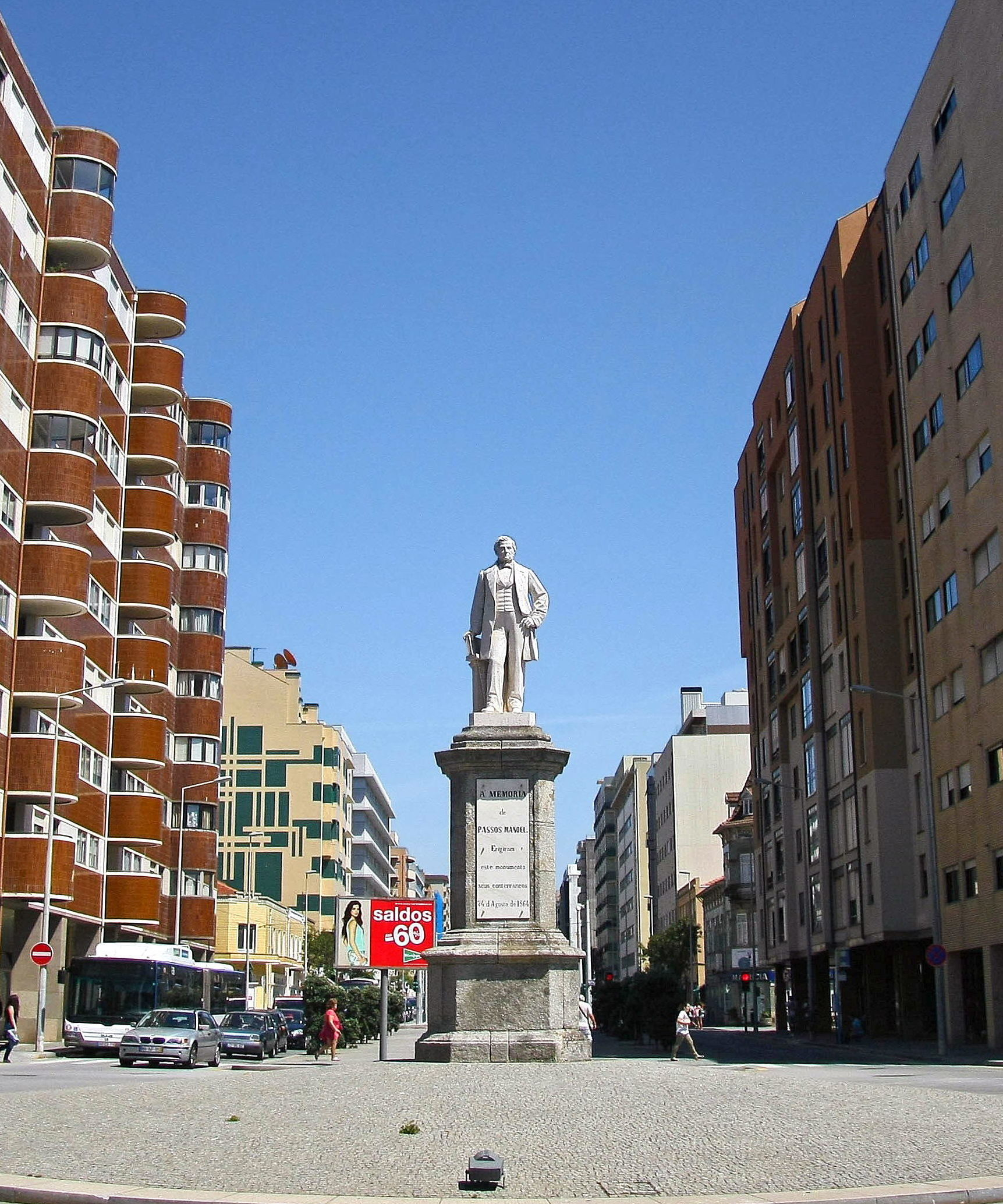
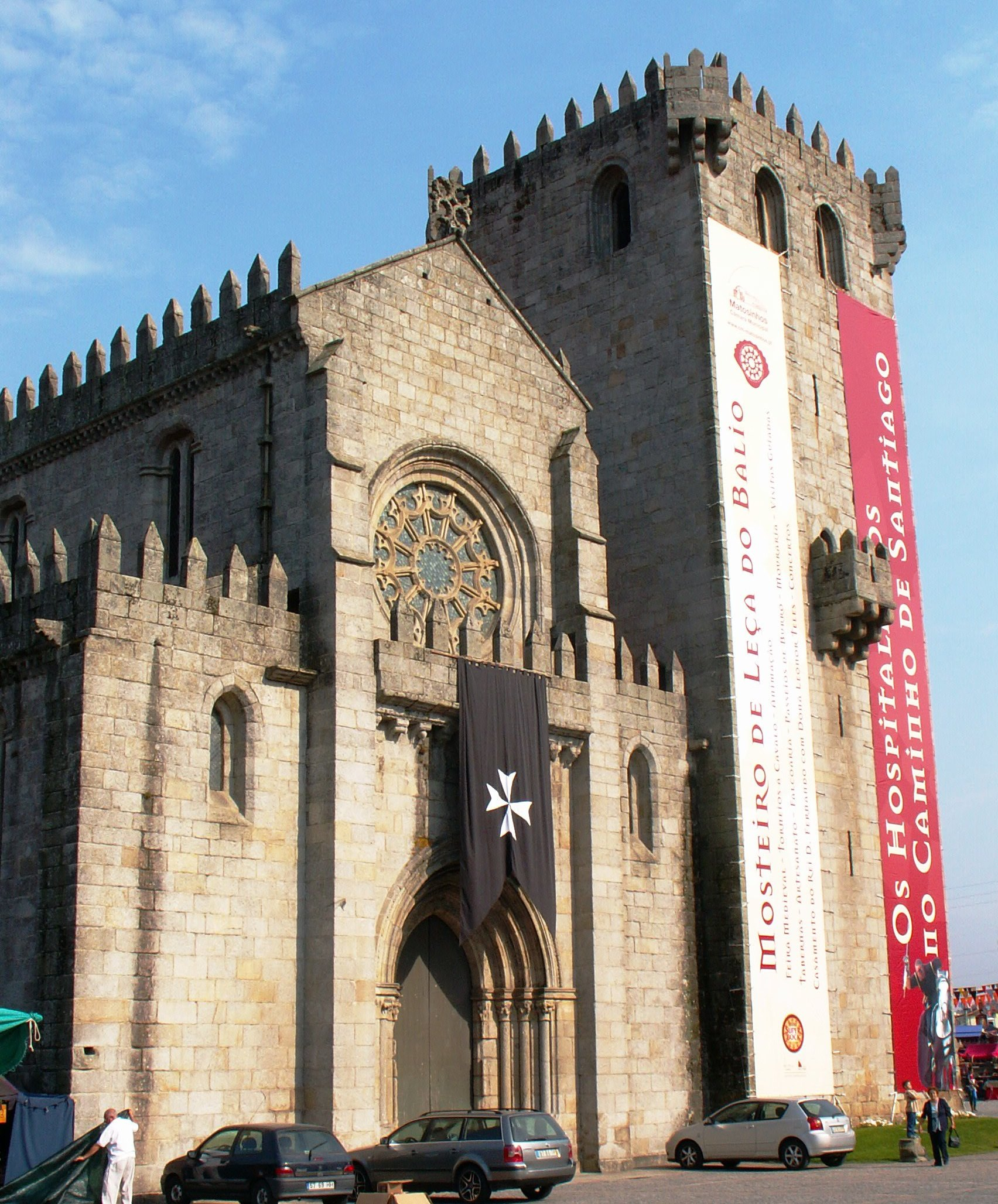
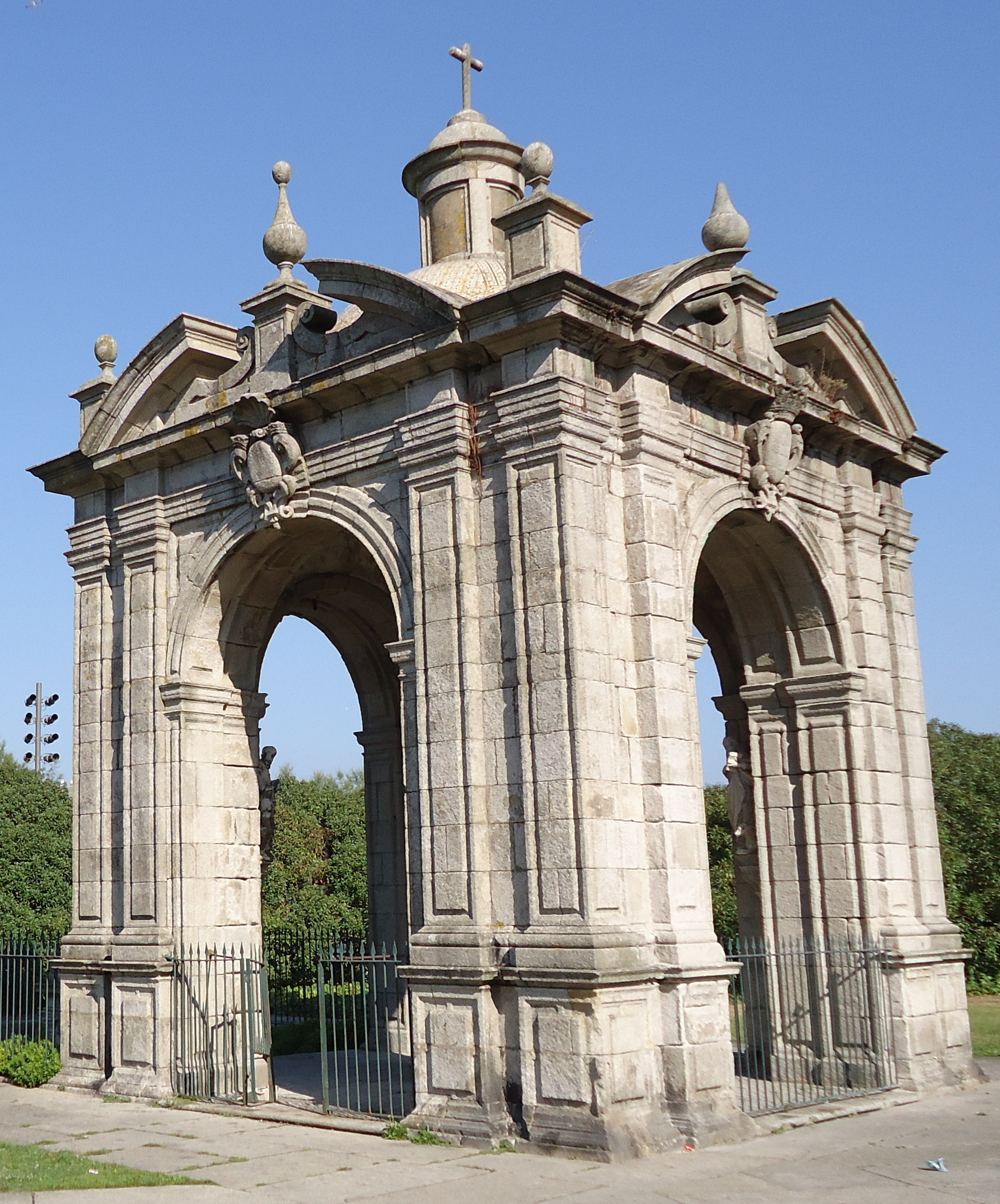
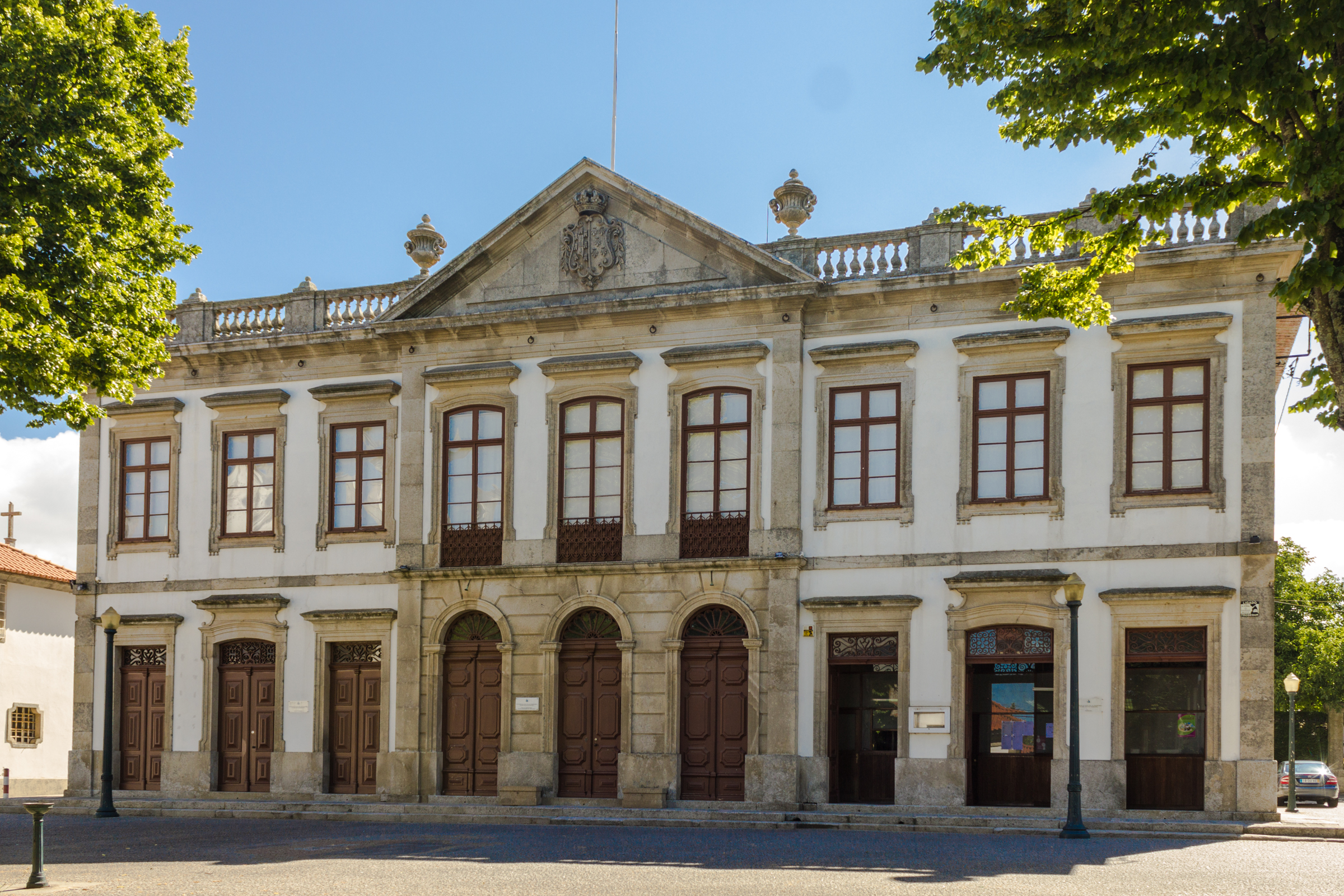
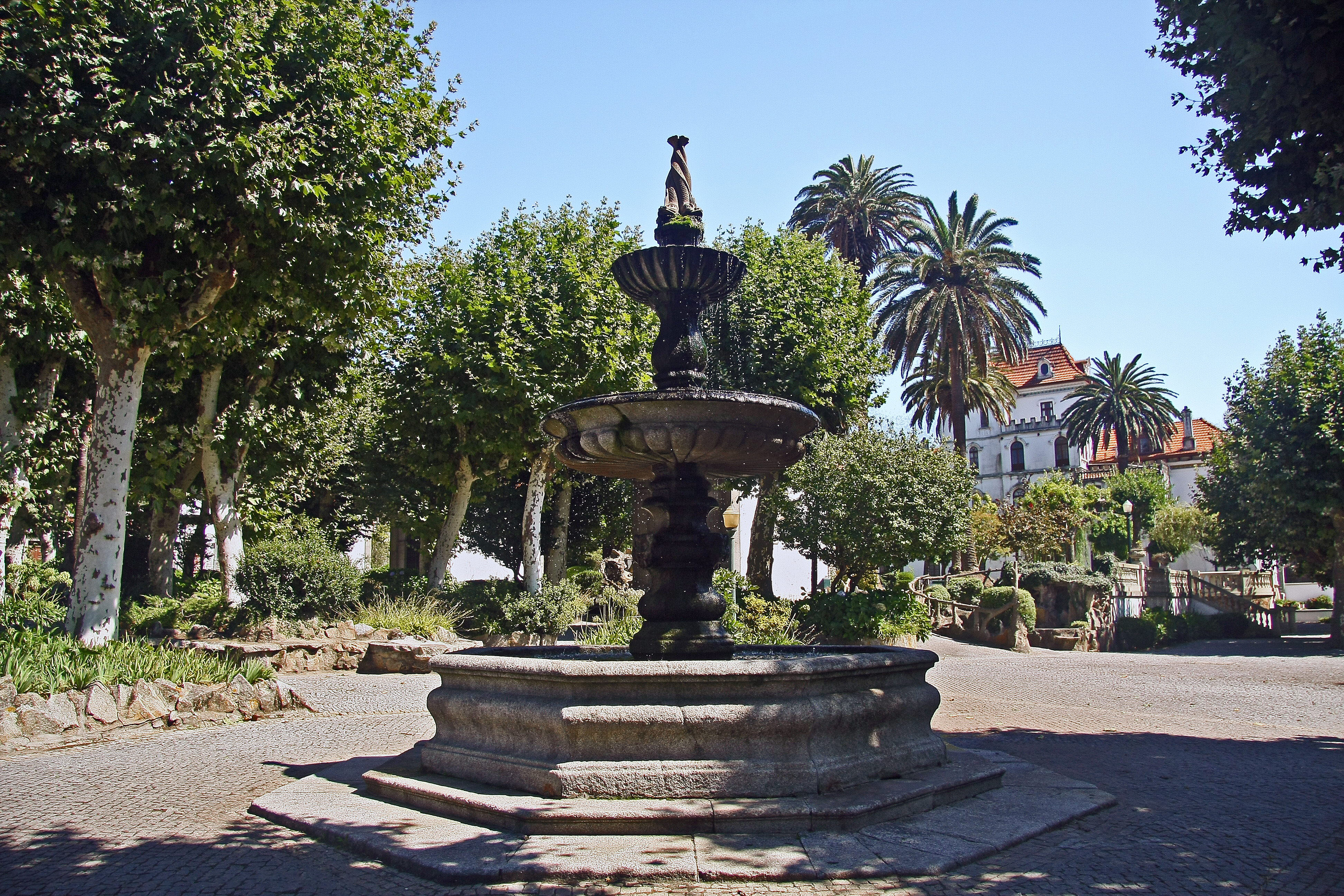

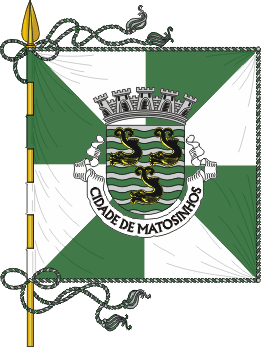
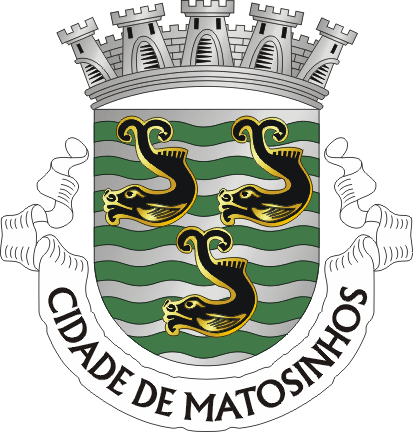
- Flag Coat of arms
- Interactive map of Matosinhos
- Location in Portugal
- Coordinates: 41°11′N 8°42′W
- Country: Portugal
- Region: Norte
- Metropolitan area: Porto
- District: Porto
- Parishes: 10

Government
  - President: Luísa Salgueiro (PS)

Area
  - Total: 62.42 km^{2} (24.10 sq mi)

Population (2021)
  - Total: 172,557
  - Density: 2,764/km^{2} (7,160/sq mi)
- Time zone: UTC+00:00 (WET)
  - Summer (DST): UTC+01:00 (WEST)
- Website: http://www.cm-matosinhos.pt

Matosinhos, (Note: Portuguese pronunciation: [mɐtuˈziɲuʃ]) officially the City of Matosinhos, is a city and a municipality in the district of Porto in Portugal. The municipality covers an area of approximately 62.42 square kilometres (24.10 mi^{2}) and had 172,557 inhabitants in 2021. It is bordered by the municipalities of Porto to the south, Maia to the east and Vila do Conde to the north and the Atlantic Ocean lies to its west. It is a part of the Porto metropolitan area, the second largest urban area in Portugal.

The city of Matosinhos is the seat of the municipality and it is located at the mouth of the Leça River, only 8 kilometres (5.0 mi) away from Porto's city center. It comprises the parishes of Matosinhos and Leça da Palmeira, which had 49,034 inhabitants in 2021. There are two other cities within the municipality, São Mamede de Infesta and Senhora da Hora, in the east of the municipality.

== History ==
=== Origins and Roman era ===
The oldest traces of human settlement in this territory extend back thousands of years and include instruments and Paleolithic artifacts found in beaches such as Boa Nova and Almeiriga. The land's settlement began around 5000 years ago, during the Neolithic, as evidenced from various funeral monuments and dolmens in Lavra, Perafita, Leça do Balio, Santa Cruz do Bispo, Guifões and São Gens.

At the end of the Bronze Age, settlements expanded into castros, proto-urban agglomerations at high altitudes. These existed in the northwestern regions of the Iberian Peninsula and predominated until the 1st century. Remnants of castros remain throughout the municipality, the most notable being Castro of Monte Castelo in Guifões, by the estuary of the Leça river.

After the Roman conquest of the Iberian Peninsula in the 1st century BC, the territory's was developed to support communication and commerce. New roads and bridges were built, including a road between the roman cities of Cale (Porto) and Bracara Augusta (Braga) and Ponte da Pedra, a bridge over the Leça river. The navigability of the estuary of the Leça River permitted goods from the Roman Empire to be discharged in the area of Castro of Monte Castelo and distributed to other sites within the region. Around the 4th and 5th centuries, a Roman villa and salt production and fish salting structures were built in Angeiras (Lavra), in the north of the municipality.

=== Middle Ages ===
Between the 5th and 7th centuries, the area became a part of the Kingdom of the Suebi and later the Visigothic Kingdom. During this period, Castro of Monte Castelo was abandoned, while the previous Roman settlement in Angeiras remained populated and included a monastery, as referred in the administrative document Parochiale suevorum.

In the 10th century, the Monastery of Bouças was founded in Bouças de Baixo, in the northeast of what is now the city of Matosinhos. It housed the image of Bom Jesus (Good Jesus) of Bouças (nowadays of Matosinhos), an important local religious icon. A settlement gradually formed around the monastery, leading to the creation of the administrative centre of the Julgado de Bouças in the 13th century. Matosinhos itself also dates back to the 10th century, appearing in records as Matesinus, and later as Matusiny, in the 1258 Inquirições of Afonso III. At that time, it was a modest settlement within the parish of Sandim.

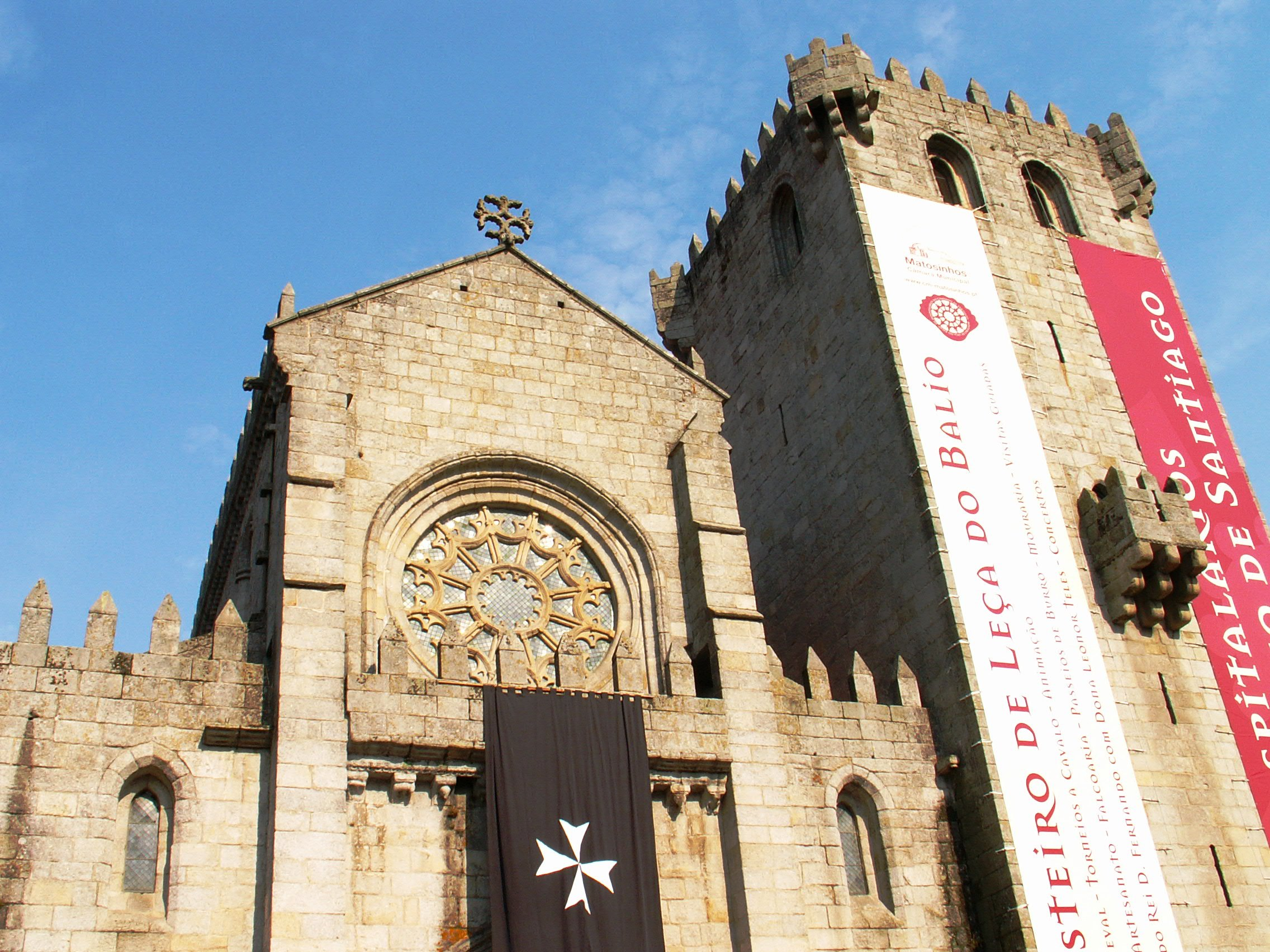
The facade of the Monastery of Leça de Balio

Also during the 10th century, the Monastery of Leça do Balio was established near Ponte da Pedra. In the 12th century, likely between 1112 and 1128, Countess Theresa of Portugal donated the monastery to the Sovereign Military Order of Malta, marking their first foothold in the country. In 1140, King Afonso I granted the order jurisdiction over the parishes of Leça, Custóias, Barreiros, Gueifães and S. Mamede. The order also owned other properties in the region, including the monasteries of Lavra, Moreira and Aldoar.

By the end of the 14th century, the small community of Franciscan friars installed themselves along the beach of Boa Nova, founding the Oratory of São Clement das Penhas. This small convent would give rise to the Convent of Conceição de Leça, which was founded in the 15th century, where the municipal park of Quinta da Conceição exists nowadays.

=== Modern era ===
In 1514, Matosinhos received a foral (charter) from King Manuel I, asserting it as an important agricultural center. Matosinhos becomes an important supplier of goods to Porto, at a time when the parishes of Ramalde, Foz and Aldoar were part of the territory of Matosinhos.

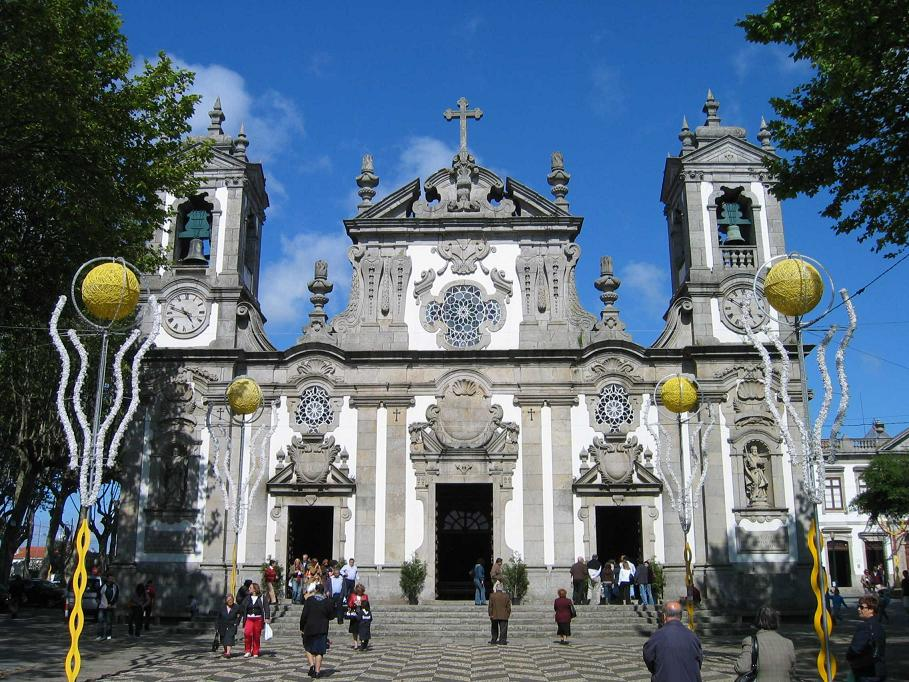
The Church of Bom Jesus of Matosinhos

During the 16th century, the Church of Bom Jesus of Matosinhos (Igreja do Bom Jesus de Matosinhos) was built and the image of Bom Jesus (Good Jesus) was transferred there from the Monastery of Bouças. As people from Matosinhos emigrate to Brazil during the Age of Discoveries, the cult to the image grows abroad, culminating with the founding of the Confraria do São Salvador de Bouças during the 17th century. Supported by the growing worship and the gold mined in Brazil, the church was remodeled in the 18th century by Italian architect Nicolau Nasoni. The architect had worked in other projects in the municipality, such as the estates of Chantre (Leça do Balio) and Bispo (Santa Cruz do Bispo), as well as the Chapel of São Francisco (in the Quinta do Conceição).

In 1638, a decision was taken by the count of Penaguião, D. João Sá e Menezes, to build the Fort of Leça da Palmeira. The fort would be located in the northern shore of the Leça river estuary and it would improve coastal defenses near Porto. The fort would receive its first garrison in 1646, but it wasn't until 1720 that construction was completed. By 1844, the fort no longer hosted a garrison or served a military purpose, instead being repurposed for civil functions.

In 1832, during the Liberal Wars an army under the command of D. Pedro disembarked in the beach in Arnosa do Pampelido, starting a military offensive in continental Portugal that would depose the conservative traditionalists in favor of the liberal constitutionalists. In 1862, an obelisk made of granite was inaugurated celebrating this victory, including a speech attributed to the king believed to have said prior to disembarking.

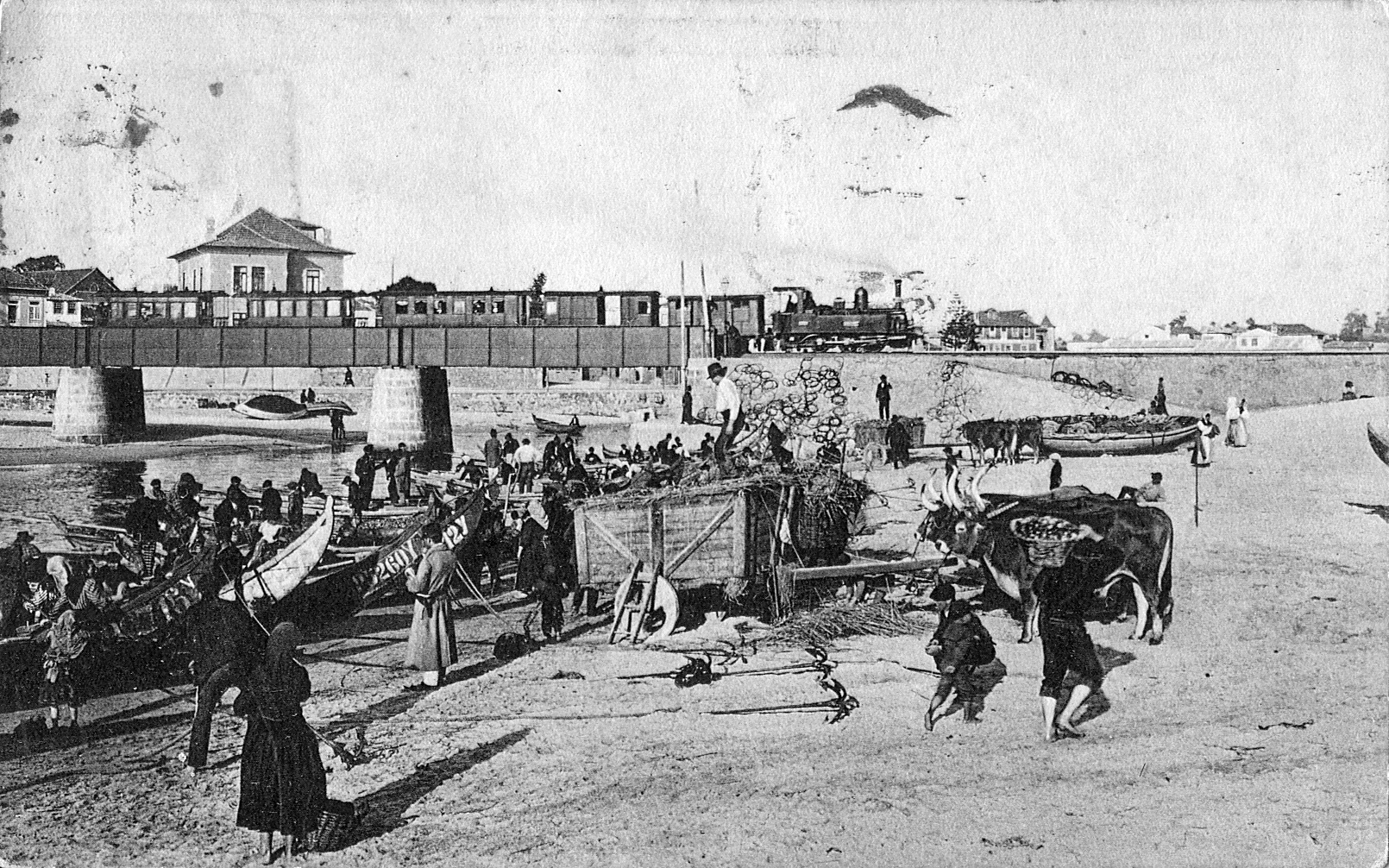
A turn-of-the-century perspective in Matosinhos: part of the annual sardine fishing season

In 1833, during the administrative reforms, the municipality of Bouças was created, encompassing the localities of Bouças, Guifões, Leça da Palmeira, Nevogilde, Ramalde and Lordelo do Ouro. In 1836, it was expanded to include the localities of Aldoar, Custoias, Infesta, Leça do Balio, Santa Cruz do Bispo, Lavra, Perafita and Paranhos (until 1837), the majority of which had been a part of the old Couto de Leça, while Lordelo do Ouro was ceded to Porto municipality. As the seat of the municipality with 500 households, Bouças was elevated into a town in the locality of Senhora da Hora. In 1853, the seat was moved to the newly established town of Matosinhos, encompassing the civil parishes of Matosinhos and Leça da Palmeira. In 1985, the municipality underwent its last territorial changes, when the localities of Nevogilde, Ramalde and Aldoar were transferred to Porto, upon the opening of circunvalação, a ring road around Porto that would define its city limits. In 1909, the municipality changed its name to Matosinhos, since locality of Bouças had lost its significance.

At the end of the 19th century, the Port of Leixões was constructed to provide a sheltered port to service the city of Porto, which supported Matosinhos's fishing industry and led to the development of a local fish canning industry. Production and exports of canned fish in Matosinhos rose during the world wars and peaked between 1940 and 1960, when there were a total of 54 factories. Between 1970 and 1989, the industry started declining and several factories closed down.

The Port of Leixões and the fishing industry contributed to economic development and a growth in resident population and in 1984 Matosinhos became a city.

== Geography ==
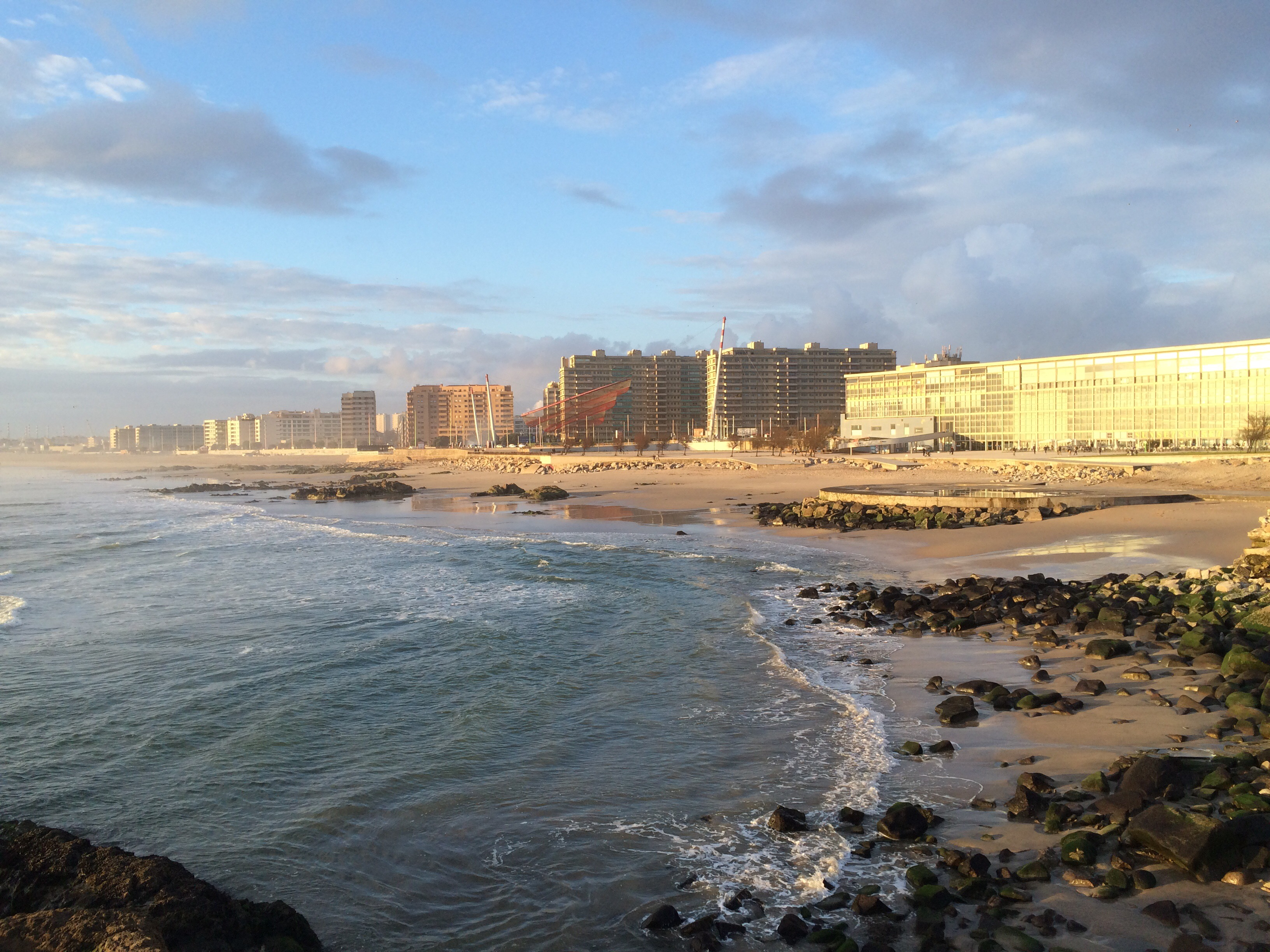
A view of the beaches of Matosinhos

Administratively, the municipality is divided into 10 civil parishes (freguesias):

- Custóias
- Guifões
- Lavra
- Leça da Palmeira
- Leça do Balio
- Matosinhos
- Perafita
- Santa Cruz do Bispo
- São Mamede de Infesta
- Senhora da Hora

== Demographics ==
Historical population

Year	Pop.	±%
1864	13,544	—
1878	15,831	+16.9%
1890	19,933	+25.9%
1900	25,071	+25.8%
1911	33,914	+35.3%
1920	34,884	+2.9%
1930	50,962	+46.1%
1940	63,124	+23.9%

Year	Pop.	±%
1950	73,786	+16.9%
1960	91,017	+23.4%
1970	109,225	+20.0%
1981	136,498	+25.0%
1991	151,682	+11.1%
2001	167,026	+10.1%
2011	175,478	+5.1%
2021	172,557	−1.7%

Source: INE

== International relations ==
=== Twin towns – sister cities ===
Matosinhos is twinned with:

- Vilagarcía de Arousa, Spain (1959)
- Congonhas, Brazil (1986)
- Mérignac, France (1988)
- Angolares, São Tomé and Príncipe (1989)
- Mansoa, Guinea-Bissau (1992)
- São Filipe, Cape Verde (1992)
- Nacala, Mozambique (1997)

Since 1994, Matosinhos has had a cooperation agreement with Luanda, Angola.

== Economy ==
Oil refinery of Galp Energia in Leça da Palmeira.

The international Leixões Cruise Terminal and a large oil refinery of Galp Energia, are located in Leça da Palmeira, Matosinhos. EFACEC, a leading Portuguese company in the electromechanics industry, is headquartered in the city. Pedro Hispano Hospital (after Pedro Hispano), is one of the most comprehensive state-run hospitals of Portugal, and serves the entire Porto Metropolitan Area.

In 2020, Galp Energia announced that the oil refinery would cease functions starting in 2021, deciding to focus all operations in the oil refinery in Sines instead.

Fishing and the fish canning industry remain present in Matosinhos, although only 3 canning factories remain: Conservas Portugal Norte, Fábrica de Conservas Pinhais and Conservas Ramirez.

== Attractions ==
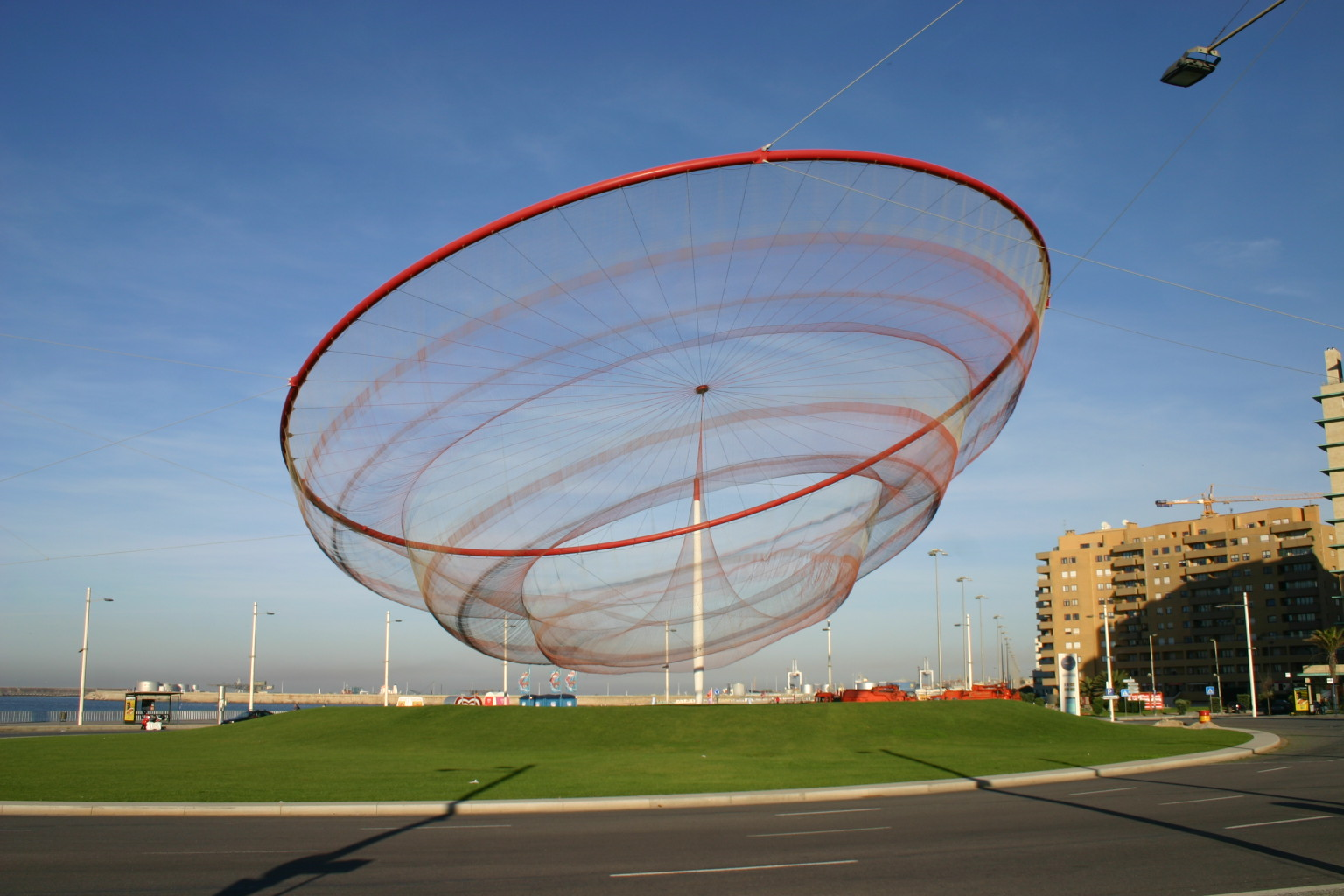
She Changes sculpture

Archaeological sites in Matosinhos include the Castro of Monte Castelo and the Roman salt production structures in Angeiras. The castro is located on the left bank of the Leça River near its former estuary and dates back to the early 1st millennium BCE, with continuous occupation through the Roman period. The Roman structures in Angeiras consist of 32 rectangular and trapezoidal tanks carved into the rock used for fish salting and salt extraction dating from the 3rd to 5th centuries.

Matosinhos features a public sculpture called She Changes, known locally as Anémona (Anemone), by American artist, Janet Echelman. It is located over the Cidade Salvador Square roundabout, by the city's seaside and at the municipality's border with Porto municipality. The installation spans approximately 148 metres (486 ft) in length 124 metres (407 ft) in width and 49 metres (161 ft) in height and it consists of a hand-woven net suspended from three steel poles, painted white with red stripes to evoke the area's historic smokestacks and lighthouses.

Tidal pools of Leça de Palmeira

Within the Leça da Palmeira coastline, there are several historical and modern landmarks, including two of Álvaro Siza Vieira’s early works from the 1960s, classified as National Monuments. The Tidal pools of Leça de Palmeira are a saltwater swimming facility built among the natural rock formations of the shoreline, using exposed concrete and a linear layout that follows the beach wall. The Boa Nova Tea House is a tea house partially embedded in the coastal rocks, with sea-facing windows and a simple interior organized around a main tea room and a small bar.

Nearby lies the Fort of Leça da Palmeira (Forte de Nossa Senhora das Neves de Leça), a star-shaped fort with four bastions and a moat. It was constructed between 1638 and 1720 to help defend the mouth of the Douro River and lost its military functions in 1844. The fort's surroundings were landscaped in 1962 and it now serves as the headquarters of the Port of Leixões captaincy. Also in Leça da Palmeira lies the Leça Lighthouse, Portugal's second tallest lighthouse, with a 46-metre (151 ft) high tower.

=== Religious architecture ===
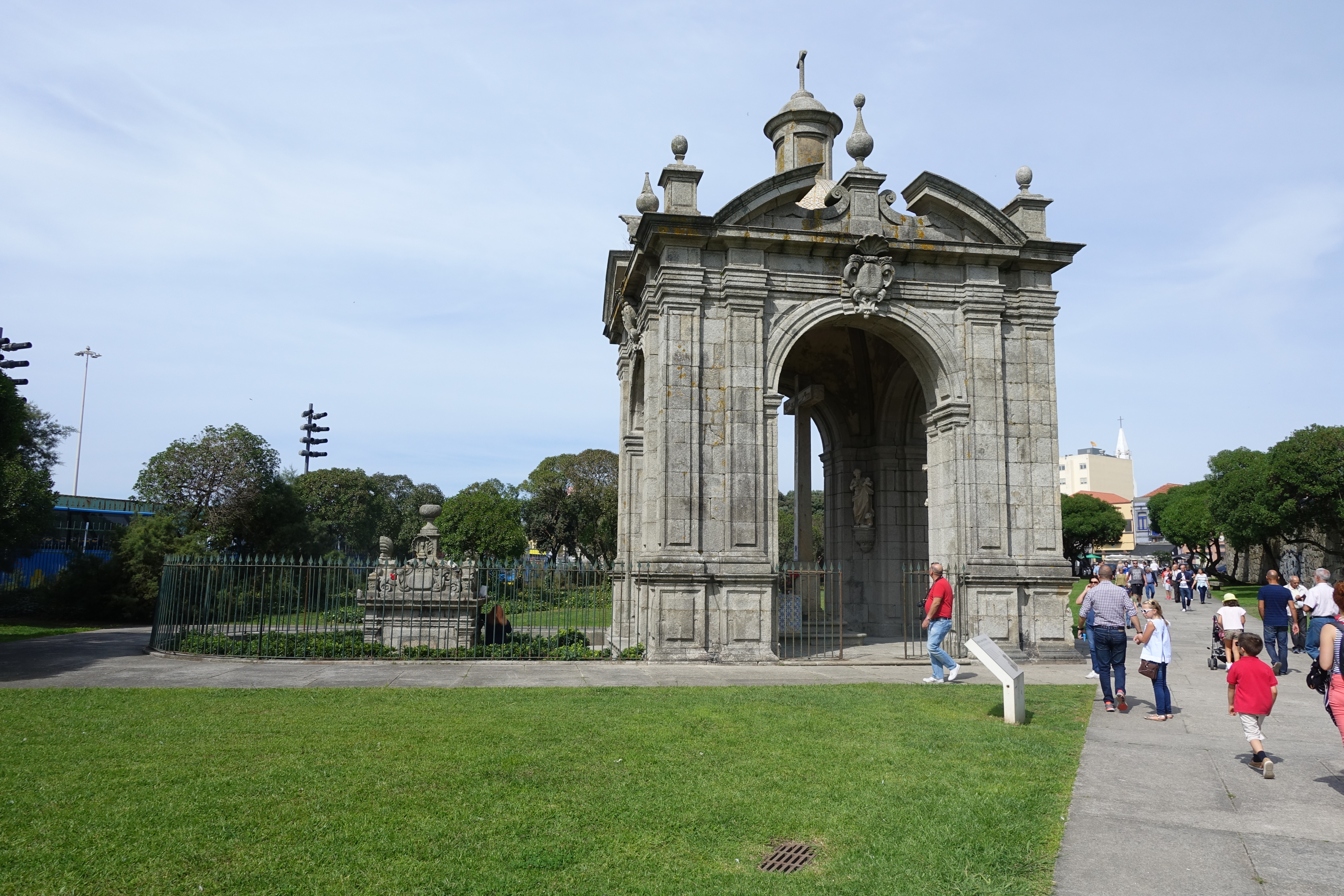
Padrão do Bom Jesus de Matosinhos

There are several examples of religious architecture and monuments in the city of Matosinhos. The Church of Bom Jesus of Matosinhos (Igreja do Bom Jesus de Matosinhos) is the city's mother church and it houses the Bom Jesus figure, a 12th century depiction of Christ, with one eye turned to Heaven and the other to Earth. It was built in the mid-16th century and remodeled in the 18th century in Baroque style by architect Nicolau Nasoni. It features a façade with twin bell towers and a gilded high altar. To the west of the church lies the Pelourinho de Matosinhos, a former 17th-century pillory, now replaced by a Latin cross, preserving only its shaft and base. By the sea, lies the Padrão do Bom Jesus de Matosinhos a pillared cross sheltered by a tiled domed canopy depicting the Crucifixion.

In Leça do Balio, lies the remains of the former Monastery of Leça do Balio, which functioned as the first headquarters of the Knights Hospitaller in Portugal in the early 12th century. Out of the monastery remains a Gothic church resembling a fortified structure with a prominent tower and machicolations. Nearby lies the Cruzeiro de Leça do Balio, a cross bearing the figure of Christ on a pillar featuring a Gothic inscription the Coelho family coat of arms. Both the church and the cross are classified as National Monuments.

== Transport ==
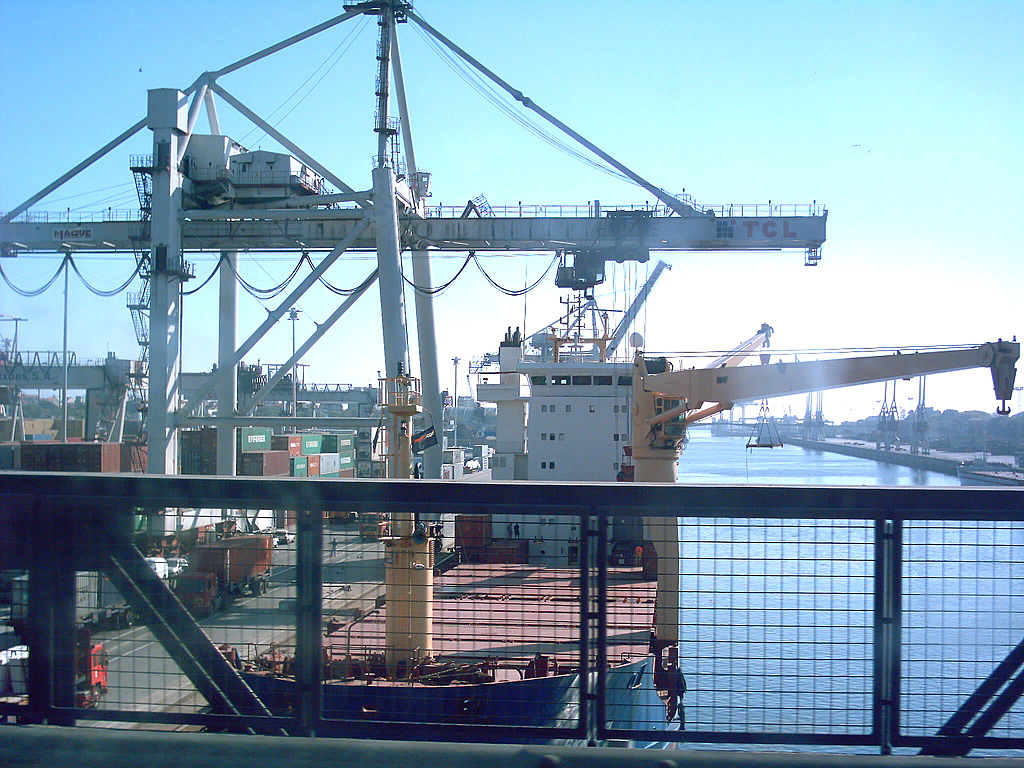
The view of the economic heart of the municipality: the Port of Leixões

The municipality is served by the Porto Metro, a light rail system with frequent services. Line A provides services between the city centers of Matosinhos and Porto, via Senhora da Hora. Lines B, C and E also service areas of the municipality between Senhora da Hora and Vila do Conde, Maia and the airport respectively.

A bus network exists across the municipality provided by various operators. In 2024, a united network of bus services across Porto's metropolitan area was founded called UNIR (Portuguese for unite), in an attempt to improve service and public transportation use. STCP, the main bus provider in Porto municipality remains separate from this network and provides services between Matosinhos and Porto.

A railway line exists connecting the Port of Leixões with Contumil in Porto, called Linha de Leixões. This line has mainly been used to transport cargo, despite an attempt to run passenger services in 2011. In December 2024, the line should reopen for passenger services between Contumil and Leça do Balio, with stops in São Gemil, Arroteia, Hospital S. João and S. Mamede de Infesta. This should allow for direct services to Campanhã in Porto and to Ovar in the district of Aveiro. An extension of the service is being considered until the Port of Leixões, by the terminus of the Porto Metro's line A.

For international travel, the Porto airport is located partly in Matosinhos municipality, while the Port of Leixões regularly receives cruise ships in its cruise terminal.

== Sport ==
=== Football ===
Matosinhos municipality is home to Portuguese top flight club Leixões Sport Club as well as Leça Futebol Clube and other minor clubs that include:

- Leixões Sport Club
- Leça Futebol Clube
- Sport Clube Senhora da Hora
- Futebol Clube de Infesta
- Padroense
- Futebol Clube de Perafita
- Juventude de Matosinhos
- Seara Futebol Clube
- Grupo Desportivo Aldeia Nova

=== Futsal ===
- ARCD Junqueira

=== Motorsport ===
- World Rally Championship – Rally de Portugal an annual event held in May over 3 days with special stages contested in the surrounding areas including Guimarães Castle, Lousada rallycross circuit, Viana do Castelo, Braga, Cabreira Mountains and Fafe.

== Notable people ==
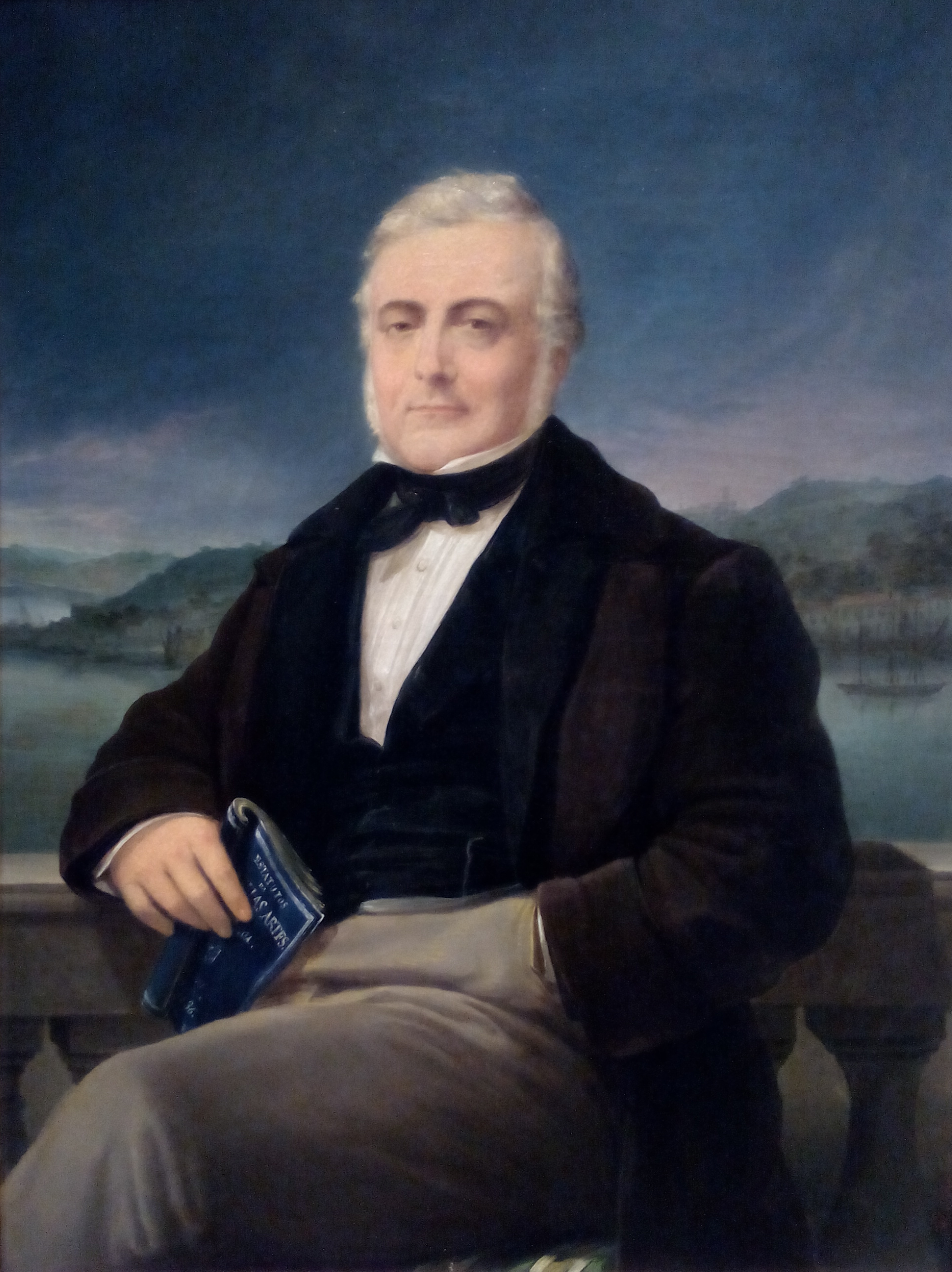
Manuel da Silva Passos, 1886

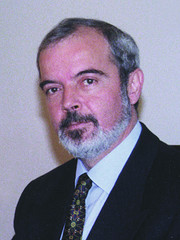
Fernando Nogueira, 2015

- António Soares Carneiro (1928–2014), a general in the Portuguese Army and governor of Portuguese Angola
- Isabel Meyrelles (born 1929), a surrealist sculptor and poet
- Fernando Nogueira (born 1950), a lawyer and former politician
- Passos Manuel (1801–1862), a jurist and politician, a notable Portuguese Liberal
- Luísa Salgueiro (born 1968), a politician, legal consultant and mayor of Matosinhos
- José Domingues dos Santos (1885–1958), a politician, professor and journalist
- Álvaro Siza Vieira (born 1933), an architect and architectural educator

=== Sport ===
- Filipe Anunciação (born 1979), a football manager and former player with 362 club appearances
- Tamagnini Batista (born 1949), known as Nené, a former footballer with 421 club appearances and 66 for Portugal
- Bruno China (born 1982), a former footballer with 366 club appearances
- Carlos Fangueiro (born 1976), known as Fangueiro, a former footballer with 374 club appearances
- Francisco Faria (1949–2004), known as Chico Faria, a footballer with 334 club appearances
- José Ferreirinha (1960–1990), known as Zé Beto, a goalkeeper with 144 club appearances
- João Fonseca (born 1948), known as Fonseca, a former football goalkeeper with 390 club appearances
- José Gomes (born 1970), a football manager
- Rodrigo Mora (born 2007), a footballer with 32 international youth caps
- Domingos Paciência (born 1969), a former footballer with 313 club appearances and a football manager
- André Simões (born 1989), a footballer with over 337 club appearances
- Pedro Soeiro (born 1975), a former professional road cyclist

== See also ==
- Leixões
