= Carlos João Chambers Ramos =

Portuguese architect (1897–1969)

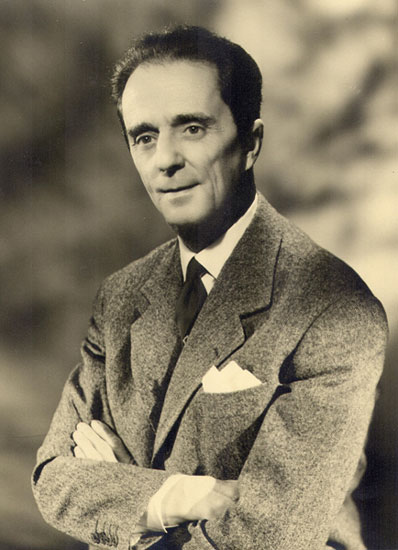
- Born: 15 January 1897; Bonfim, Porto, Portugal
- Died: 1 July 1969 (aged 72); Lisbon, Portugal
- Resting place: Prazeres Cemetery
- Education: Lisbon School of Fine Arts
- Occupations: Architect and university professor
- Years active: 1921–1969
- Spouse: Clarisse Cândida Garrocho Ventura
- Children: Carlos Manuel Oliveira Ramos
- Awards: Officer of the Military Order of Saint James of the Sword (1941); Valmor Prize (1958); Grand Officer of the Order of Public Education (1966).
- Projects: Portuguese Institute of Oncology (IPO), Lisbon
- Design: Radio Pavilion (IPO)

Carlos João Chambers Ramos (1897 – 1969) was a Portuguese architect, urban planner, and educator.

== Early life ==
Ramos was born on 15 January 1897 and baptised six days later, in the parish of Bonfim in Porto. He was the son of Manuel Maria de Oliveira Ramos and Inês Chambers, who had a British father, and spent his childhood in Lisbon after his father obtained a post to teach history at the University of Lisbon. He graduated in architecture from the Lisbon School of Fine Arts in 1920, where he was a classmate of other noted architects such as Cottinelli Telmo, Paulino Montez, Luís Cristino da Silva, and Porfírio Pardal Monteiro, as well as of José Leitão de Barros, who taught design before going on to become a noted film director. Telmo was his best man when he married Clarisse Cândida Garrocho Ventura in Lisbon on 27 October 1921. She came from Olhão in the Algarve, and was the daughter of a canning industrialist. Ramos would design several buildings in her howmetown. Their son, Carlos Manuel Oliveira Ramos, would also become an architect.

== Career ==
Ramos was one of the pioneers of modern architecture in Portugal, together with Monteiro, Telmo, Da Silva, Cassiano Branco, and Jorge Segurado. His early work reveals a desire to align with the trends in international architecture of the first decades of the 20th century. However, like some of his fellow architects, he would later shift to the traditional and monumental bias of the style promoted by the authoritarian Estado Novo government, feeling the need to compromise his ideals in order to ensure his professional survival. The relatively limited scope of his built work, as a result of his teaching activities, does not reflect the influence he exerted on subsequent generations as a professor and director of the Porto School of Fine Arts, which was linked to the origins of the Porto School architecture movement.

Ramos worked in the office of Miguel Ventura Terra between 1919 and 1921 and, in 1921, in that of Raul Lino. Among his early work, in 1925, was the restoration of the Bristol Club, a nightclub in Lisbon, that involved several well-known artists, such as Almada Negreiros, Eduardo Viana, and Leopoldo de Almeida. He was the designer of emblematic projects of early modernism and Art Deco in Portuguese architecture, notably the unbuilt "rationalist project" for the D. Filipa de Lencastre High School in Lisbon, which he presented at the First Salon of Independents of the National Society of Fine Arts in 1930, and the Radio Pavilion, which was part of the Portuguese Institute of Oncology (IPO) in Lisbon, a hospital complex that he designed. The Pavilion was described as echoing the teachings of Walter Gropius and the Bauhaus, consisting of "a unitary volume defined by smooth surfaces and a flat roof, with a complete absence of decoration". Beyond its modernist architecture, this building was also the first European facility designed to adhere to the guidelines established at the Second International Congress of Radiology in Stockholm in 1928.

He first taught at the Pedro Nunes High School in Lisbon. In 1933, he applied for the position of professor of architecture at the Lisbon School of Fine Arts, but the post was given to Da Silva. After this setback he transformed his Lisbon studio into a practical school for a new generation of architects who found there a counterpoint to the academic teaching led by the School of Fine Arts. He played an extremely important role in raising awareness among these new architects, who included Francisco Keil do Amaral, among many others. During the late 1930s he became an essential reference and source of encouragement for budding architects.

In 1940, he joined the Porto School of Fine Arts as an architecture professor, becoming director in 1952 and serving in that position until 1967. Taking a break from teaching in Porto, he taught urban planning at the Lisbon School of Fine Arts between 1946 and 1948. Among the architects who came under his guidance in Porto were Fernando Távora and Álvaro Siza Vieira. He introduced several innovations in architectural education, encouraging students to work with professional architectural practices. This promoted collaboration between students and faculty at the School as they also worked for private practices. In the classroom he encouraged students to develop their argumentative skills by defending their technical choices. However, from the 1940s onward, Carlos Ramos himself felt it best to follow the monumentalist and traditionalist style of the Estado Novo and his architecture became more substantial and conventional. This is best reflected in his design for the Évora courthouse.

== Awards and honours ==
Ramos was made an Officer of the Military Order of Saint James of the Sword in 1941. In 1959 he became Vice-President of the International Union of Architects. In 1966, he was made a Grand Officer of the Order of Public Education. Other awards included the Valmor Prize in 1958, and the Diário de Notícias Prize and National Art Prize, both in 1964.

== Death ==
Ramos died on 1 July 1969 in Lisbon. Lisbon. He had suffered from bladder cancer. He was buried in the Prazeres Cemetery.

His name has been given to geographical features in Almada, Lisbon, Maia, and Porto.
