= Faculty of Architecture of the University of Porto =

Architecture faculty of the University of Porto, Portugal

Coordinates: 41°9′1″N 8°38′10″W

- Faculdade de Arquitectura da Universidade do Porto
- The faculty building, designed by Álvaro Siza, in 2025
- Type: Public
- Established: 1979
- Parent institution: University of Porto
- Director: João Pedro Xavier
- Location: Porto, Portugal
- Campus: Campo Alegre
- Website: sigarra.up.pt/faup/

The Faculty of Architecture of the University of Porto (Portuguese: Faculdade de Arquitectura da Universidade do Porto), or FAUP, is the school of architecture of the University of Porto, in Portugal. It was created by decree in December 1979 from the architecture section of the Porto School of Fine Arts, whose course it gradually replaced, under an installation committee presided over by Fernando Távora. The faculty presents itself as the heir to a teaching tradition shared with the Faculty of Fine Arts since 1779, and it is associated with the architectural tradition known as the Porto School.

The faculty offers an integrated master's degree in architecture, a master's degree in urban planning and design and doctoral programmes; its research unit is the Nuno Portas Centre for Studies. Its teaching gives a central place to drawing and to learning through design practice.

Its building on the university's Campo Alegre campus, above the Douro, was designed by its former teacher Álvaro Siza and built in phases from the mid-1980s: the adaptation of the Quinta da Póvoa estate and the Carlos Ramos Pavilion, followed by a main complex formed by a northern block and four towers facing the river. It is one of the works included in the nomination of Siza's architecture for the UNESCO World Heritage List, which the faculty coordinates. Teachers of the faculty have included Távora, Siza, Eduardo Souto de Moura, Alexandre Alves Costa and Nuno Portas.

== History ==
The faculty presents itself as the heir to a tradition shared with the Faculty of Fine Arts since the Drawing Class (Aula de Debuxo e Desenho), founded in Porto in 1779. In the 20th century architecture was taught at the Porto School of Fine Arts, whose teaching was modernised under the architect Carlos Ramos, its director from 1952 to 1969; according to the architect and historian Eduardo Fernandes, the birth of the Porto School is nonetheless mainly related to Fernando Távora.

Decree-Law no. 498-F/79 of 21 December 1979 created the Faculty of Architecture within the University of Porto, with administrative, pedagogical and scientific autonomy, to provide training in architecture and urban planning and to conduct research in those fields. The decree placed the new faculty under an installation committee and provided that, as each year of its new course came into operation, the corresponding subjects of the architecture section of the School of Fine Arts would cease to be taught. Fernando Távora presided over the installation committee, and Alexandre Alves Costa was one of its members. According to Fernandes, the transition from the School of Fine Arts to the university involved great internal debate in the late 1970s and early 1980s.

The Ministry of Public Works bought the Quinta da Póvoa, an estate on the Campo Alegre slope above the Douro, by a deed of 30 November 1984 and handed it over to the faculty on 18 December of that year. Siza first adapted the estate's existing buildings and added a pavilion in its garden, and then designed the faculty's main building on the neighbouring Quinta da Esperança, whose first stone was laid in October 1988. Siza taught at the faculty until his last lecture, in October 2003.

Since 2021 the faculty has coordinated the nomination "Architectural Works of Álvaro Siza in Portugal" for inscription on the World Heritage List, which includes the faculty building among eight works by the architect; in July 2025 the World Heritage Committee deferred its examination and recommended that the nomination be revised to include fewer works.

== Teaching and research ==
In 2026/27 the faculty offers an integrated master's degree in architecture, a five-year programme; a master's degree in urban planning and design, taught jointly with the Faculty of Engineering; a doctoral programme in architecture; and, with other faculties, a doctoral programme in occupational safety and health. It also runs advanced-studies and continuing-education courses on territory and architectural heritage.

Fernandes counts among the shared traits of the Porto School the practice of manual drawing as a primary method of conception and a concern with the relationship between a building and its context. According to the architects María Pía Fontana and Daniel de Castro, the school's model rests on learning through design practice, with drawing as its central tool and the theory and practice of design taught as a single activity; the small size of the studios reinforces the relationship between teacher and student.

The faculty's research unit, the Nuno Portas Centre for Studies (CENP), formerly the Centre for Studies in Architecture and Urbanism (CEAU), is organised in eight research groups and had 85 integrated researchers holding doctorates; it was rated "Very Good" for the period 2025–2029.

== Building ==
The faculty building and, to the left, the Quinta da Póvoa, in 2024

The faculty stands on the Campo Alegre campus of the university, in the parish of Lordelo do Ouro e Massarelos, on a steep triangular plot bounded to the north by the access roads to the Arrábida Bridge, to the south by the Via Panorâmica above the Douro and to the east by the wall of the Quinta da Póvoa. The Quinta da Póvoa, also known as the Quinta do Gólgota, had a two-storey house of the 19th or early 20th century, known as the Pink House (Casa Cor-de-Rosa), stables and a walled garden with a fountain, greenhouses and a viewpoint over the river.

In a first phase, Siza adapted the house and the stables with few changes: the house initially held the faculty's secretariat, library, assembly hall and bar, and the stables were used as studios. At the north-western end of the garden he built the Carlos Ramos Pavilion (1985–1986), conceived as a provisional building and organised in a U-shape around a semi-open courtyard, its placement conditioned by the existing trees.

The main building was built in phases between the mid-1980s and the second half of the 1990s. (Note: The dates given for the works vary between sources: for the adaptation of the house, 1984–1986 or 1983–1985; for the main building, 1986–1993, 1986–1996 or 1985–1997.) Its volumes follow the alignments of the walls of the Quinta da Póvoa and of the Pink House. To the north, a continuous string of volumes – a linear block, a semicircular body and a prismatic volume – houses the administration, the auditorium, the exhibition gallery and the library and shields the courtyard from the traffic of the bridge access roads; to the south, four free-standing towers of four storeys, which hold the studios, turn their narrow fronts towards the river. A tower was left out so that the courtyard opens towards the Arrábida Bridge, and the parts of the complex are linked by a network of atria, galleries, ramps and stairs.

Set on terraces supported by the stone walls of the Quinta da Póvoa, the complex was described in 1995 as a kind of acropolis. According to the architect Manuel Montenegro, the design evolved from a monumental building that would mark the landscape of the mouth of the Douro into one that dissolves into its surroundings, letting the greenery of the former private gardens into the public space. Helder Casal Ribeiro and Silvia Ramos describe the faculty as "a repository of design solutions" that can be studied as a learning tool.

In 2021, when the building was, according to the faculty, the subject of a classification procedure as a national monument, the four faculties of the Campo Alegre campus contested the proposals for a new metro bridge over the Douro next to the campus as harmful to the landscape. The environmental impact study of the line recognised a "quite significant" negative impact on the landscape, though not an "unacceptable disruption", and provided for a cut in the old wall of the Quinta da Póvoa.

The courtyard between the faculty buildings, in 2011

A view between the towers, in 2011

== Notable people ==
Fernando Távora, who studied architecture at the Porto School of Fine Arts and became a full professor of the faculty, presided over its installation committee; the faculty's main auditorium bears his name. Álvaro Siza studied at the School of Fine Arts between 1949 and 1955 and taught there and at the faculty, which he left in 2003; he received the Pritzker Architecture Prize in 1992. Eduardo Souto de Moura studied at the School of Fine Arts and at the faculty, graduating in 1980; he taught at the faculty from 1981 to 1990 and again from 2003, and received the Pritzker Prize in 2011.

Other teachers include Alexandre Alves Costa, a member of the installation committee, later president of the faculty's governing board and a full professor from 1996; the architect and urban planner Nuno Portas, who joined the faculty in 1983, taught the theory and history of contemporary urbanism, founded the university's master's programme in urban planning and design and presided over the faculty's scientific council from 1994; and Sérgio Fernandez, who directed the faculty's study centre between 1990 and 1997 and became a professor emeritus of the university in 2008.

== See also ==
- Porto School (architecture)
- List of works by Álvaro Siza Vieira
