= Porto Convention Centre =

Porto Customshouse Congress Centre
- Centro de Congressos da Alfândega
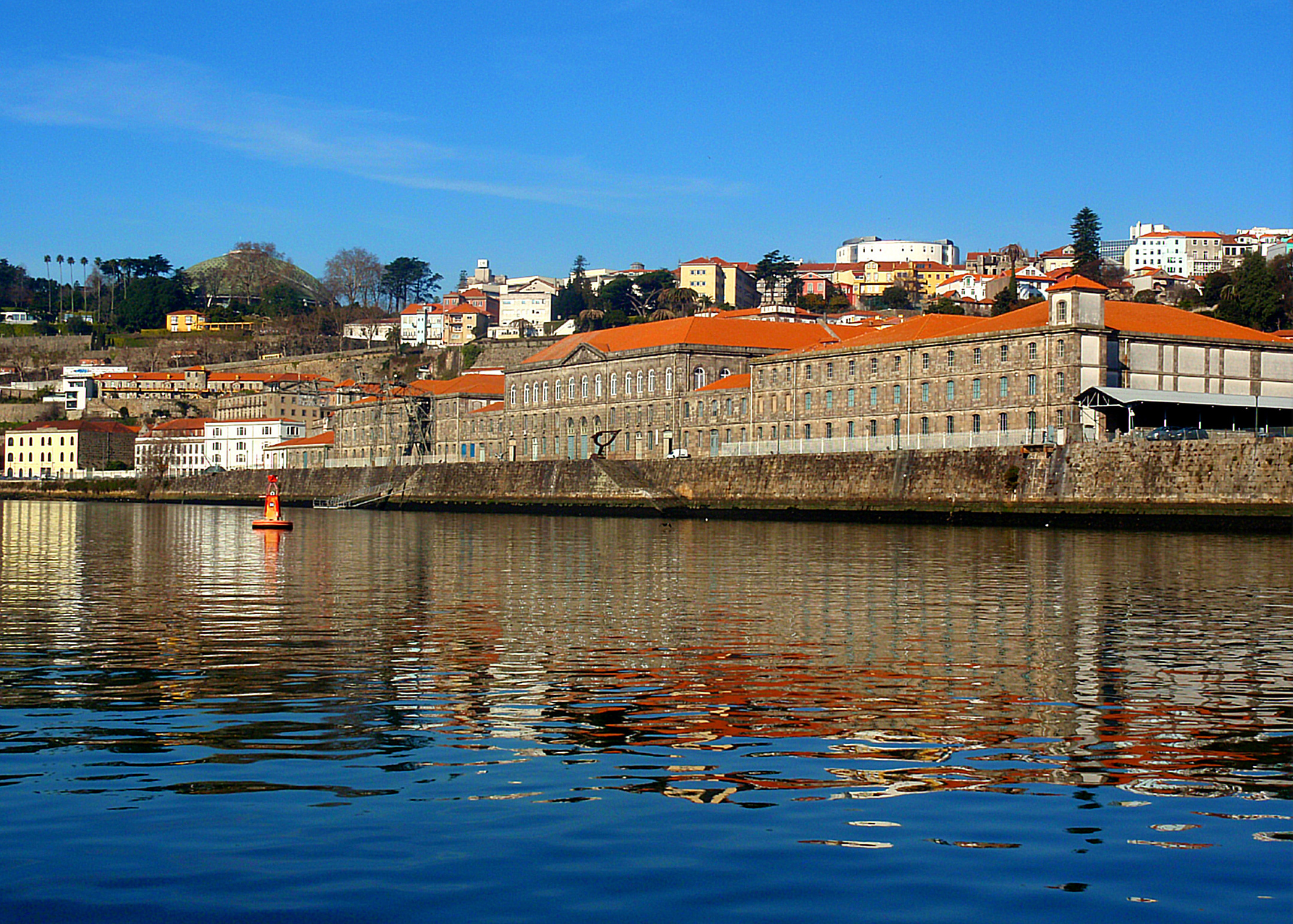
- A view of the old customshouse's installations along the north bank of the Douro River in the historic centre of Porto

General information
- Type: Customshouse/Congress Centre
- Architectural style: Neoclassicism
- Location: Cedofeita, Santo Ildefonso, Sé, Miragaia, São Nicolau e Vitória, Porto, Portugal
- Coordinates: 41°8′34.9″N 8°37′18.1″W
- Opened: 1822
- Owner: Portuguese Republic

Technical details
- Material: Granite

Design and construction
- Architect: Jean F.G. Colson

Website
- www.ccalfandegaporto.com

The Porto Customshouse Congress Centre (Portuguese: Centro de Congressos da Alfândega) is a convention centre and former-customshouse situated in the civil parish in Cedofeita, Santo Ildefonso, Sé, Miragaia, São Nicolau e Vitória, in the northern Portuguese municipality of Porto. The building is located in the historic centre of the city, along the bank of the Douro River, and was renovated under the direction of the Pritzker-awarded architect Eduardo Souto de Moura. It is part of the Museum of Transport and Communication, founded on 21 February 1992, as a non-profit institution comprising 56 individual associates and 25 institutional associates.

== History ==
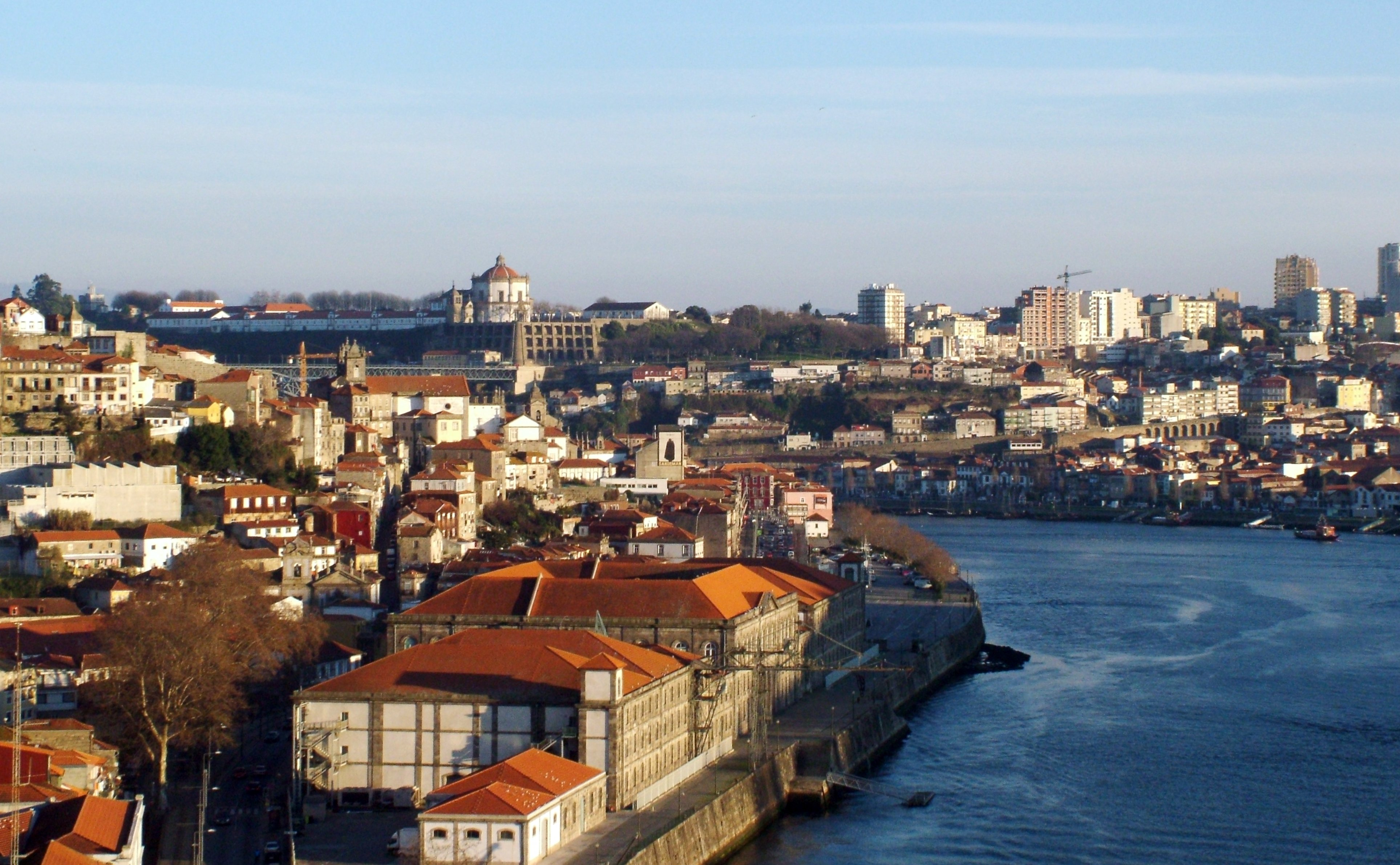
A perspective of the customshouse along the northern bank of the Douro (foreground)

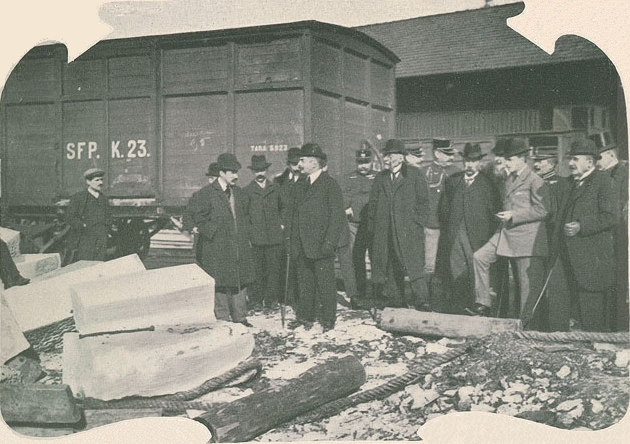
The visit of King D. Manuel II to the customshouse railway link

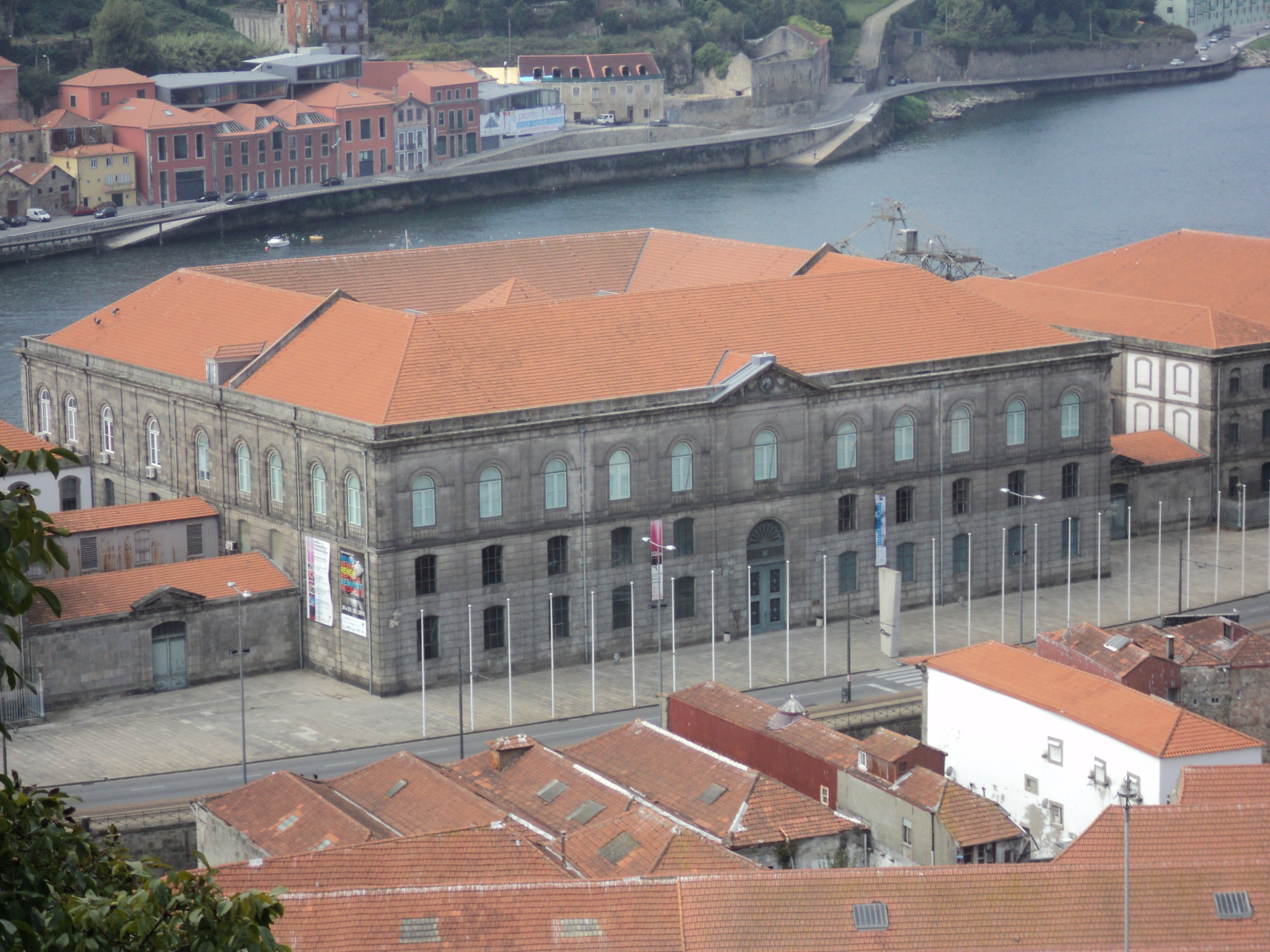
A view of the main customshouse building block

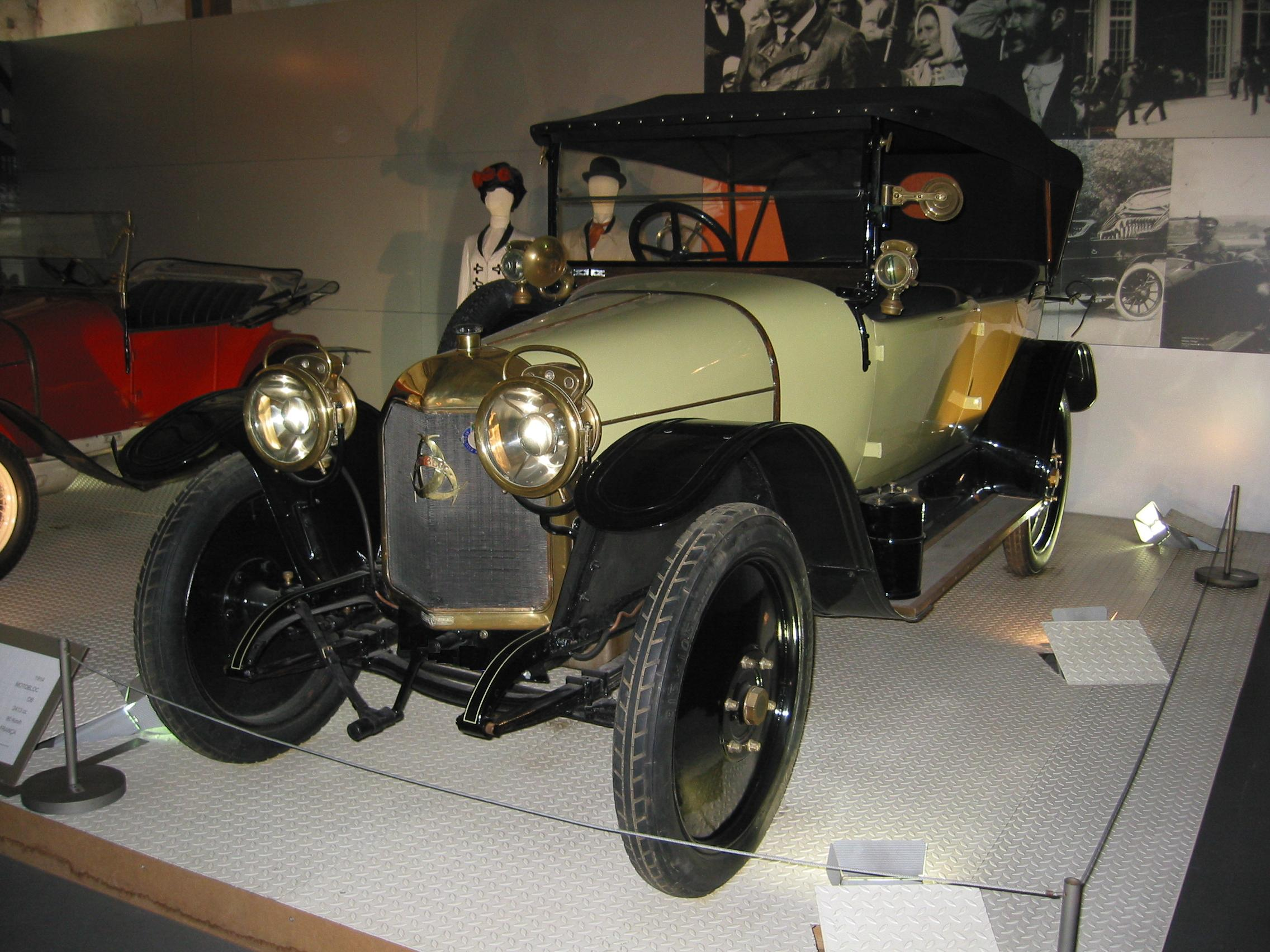
One of the vehicles from the Museum of Transport and Communication

In 1822, António José Borges, merchant in Porto, presented six plans for an urban solution for a new customshouse.

Following a governmental decree on 18 July 1834, the Administração Geral das Alfândegas do Norte (North General-Administration for Customshouses) established the Alfândega for the city of Porto. In 1840, the Ministério do Reino (Minister of the Kingdom) solicited the municipal council architects and public works engineers to evaluate the expropriations and budgets for the new building. The option to locate the building in Miragaia was floated in 1843, in plans developed by Joaquim da Costa Lima Júnior, city architect.

But, by 1845 the project had not developed further, and on 14 February architect Colson was contracted in Paris by Fontes Pereira de Melo to be the architect under the Ministério das Obras Públicas (Public Works Ministry). But, this too was delayed, then abandoned. On 14 June 1857, engineer Plácido da Cunha e Abreu elaborated a new project for the building in the lower quarter. A law was promulgated on 16 June, that authorized the government to contract a loan of 240 contos to construct the building, along with an additional 300 contos from the Commercial Bank in 1859. The plan was finally defined on 5 August 1860 for the customshouse to be constructed in Miragaia.

Between 1860 and 1870 the customshouse was constructed. The 1860 plan, oriented to east-west, projected two great spaces that were encircled by landscaping. Of those technicians involved in the project, were Faustino Vitória, José Diogo Mouzinho de Albuquerque, Francisco Mourão Pinheiro, José Vitor Lecoq, José Araújo Júnior, João Joaquim de Matos, Alberto Álvares Ribeiro and Torquato Álvares Ribeiro. Of the companies associated in the project: Bolhão, Miragaia, Bom Sucesso and the Massarelos Foundation. The Massarelos Foundation produce the base of the funicular that existed on the wharf. The building materials including steel came from France and England. Some of the structural columns and steam hoists were provided by the firm Brown Brothers & Co. With the construction of the building over the beach, the landscape and urban structure of Miragaia was changed completely.

A new loan was requested in 1862, for a further 200 contos to continue the project, that was supplemented by a further 25 contes in 1866.

In 1888, a branch of the railway was constructed between the customshouse and Campanhã.

The first work on restoring the customshouse began in 1957, under the direction of Public Works delegation for Jailhouses, Republican Guards and Fiscal/Customs Buildings, that included repairs to the roof, painting and frames. In 1959, further work was done on the building, that included updating the electrical systems and general repairs.

But, the building was abandoned by 1987, with the rise of road and rail cargo overtaking river traffic as the main source of freight traffic. On 27 March 1987, the Council of Ministers, under resolution 16/87 established that the "new" customshouse, would become the museological centre for the Museu dos Transportes Terrestres do Porto (Porto Museum for Terrestrial Transport), commissioning the creation of the Installation Committee.

On 21 February 1992, a deed was issued for the foundation of the Associação para o Museu dos Transportes e Comunicações (Museum Association for Transport and Communication).

A dispatch was issued on 31 May 1993 to begin the classification of the site. These proceedings would expire on 23 October 2009, for failure to be at the stage of public hearings. The following year an asphalted parking area would be constructed along the west extension of the building.

In October 1998, the 8th Ibero-American Summit occurred at the site.

In 2000, during the jubilee year, an exhibition was held to mark the 2000 years of the birth of Jesus Christ, with pieces of sacred art from the various dioceses in the country. The new museum inauguration opened on 18 May 2006, from various collections in the customshouses throughout Portugal. This was a library dedicated to 900 years of history. The association has as its objectives the preservation of infrastructures of recognized historical interest, a centre for document maintenance and the public development wing responsible for transport and communications issues. The collection consists ten years worth of objects, stamps, measures, stamps, books and documentation.

== Architecture ==
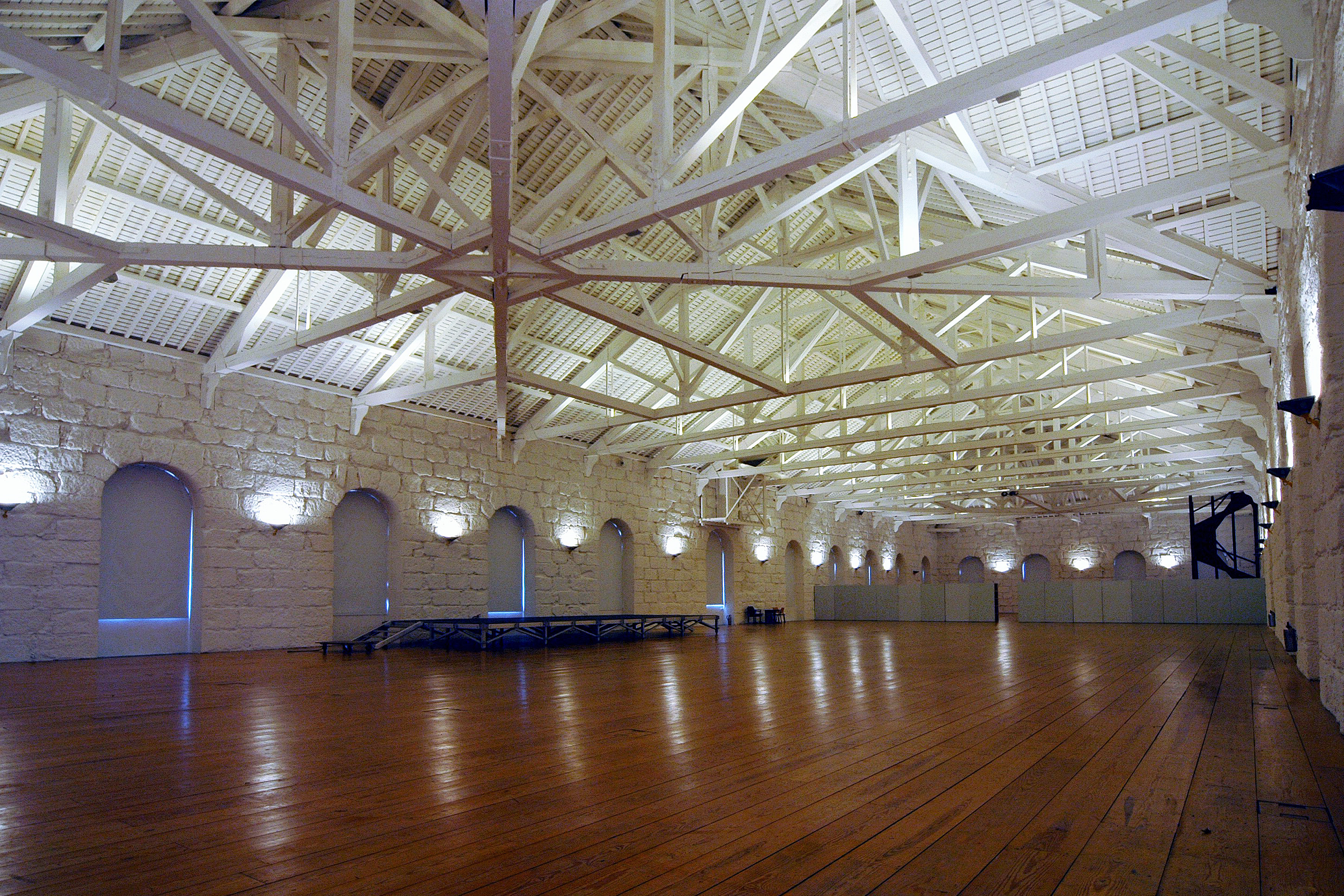
The great hall on the second-floor register of the central wing

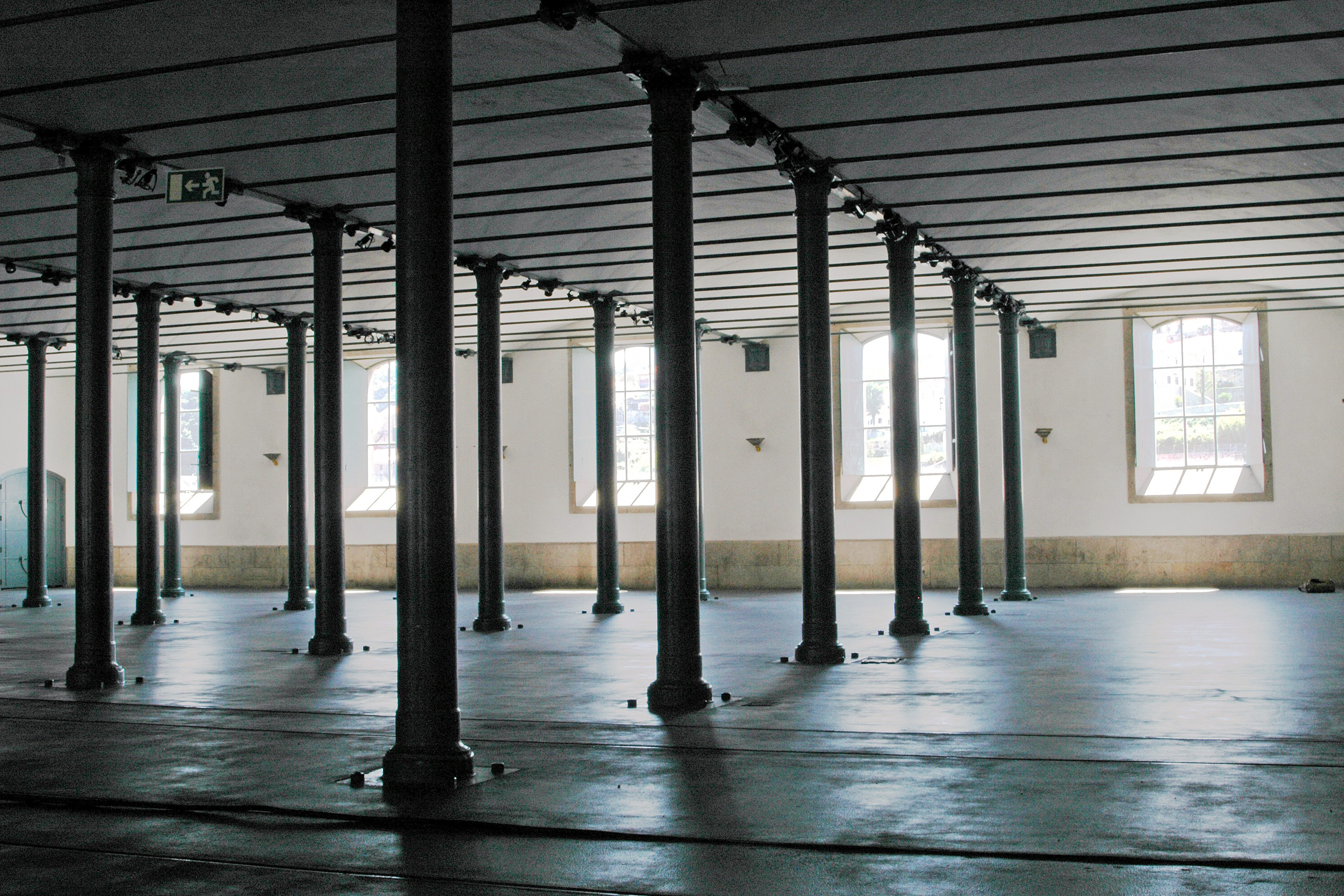
The main exposition hall

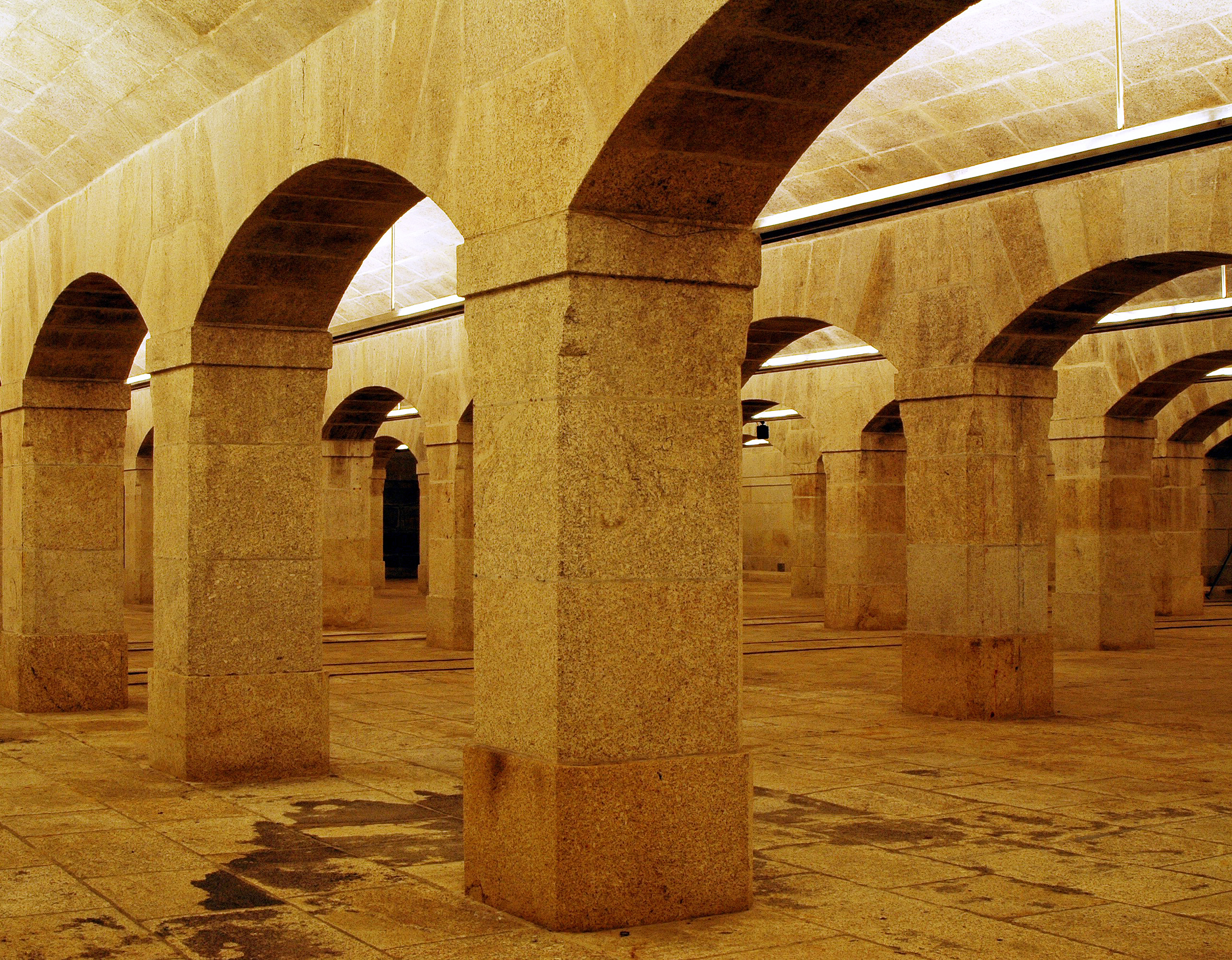
The storage vaults in the main building

The customshouse is situated along the north bank of the Douro River, implanted on a slightly elevated platform relative to the Rua de Miragaia.

The three-story building, comprises a rectangular plan, divided into four articulated-wings, covered in differentiated tile. The principal facade is oriented to the south, corresponding to the wharf's customshouse, and is marked by a central body surmounted by interrupted cornices and a large triangular pediment. The two lateral corpos are slightly shorter, and articulated with the principal body. Most of the building is covered in elongated rectangular windows with rounded lintel. The central register includes three large rounded door, surmounted on the second floor by three rounded windows on the second and third floors, but extending along the entire third floor. The remainder of the ground floor includes rounded windows and doors, while the second register, on the lateral wings, include smaller rounded windows.
