= Porto School (architecture) =

Portuguese architecture movement

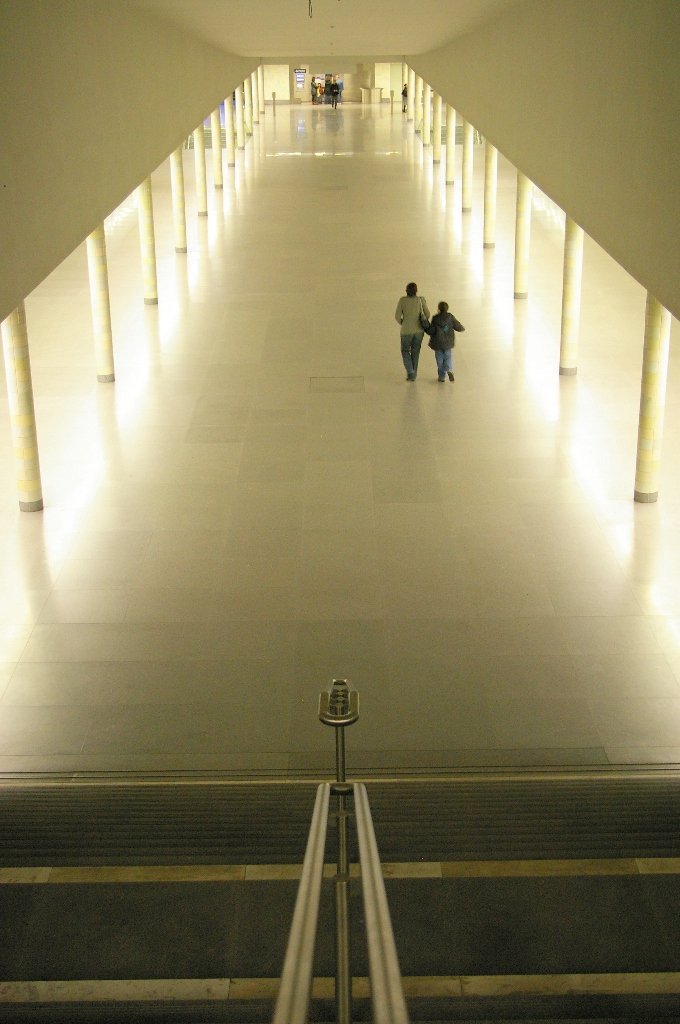
São Bento metro station, designed by Álvaro Siza Vieira

The Porto School is a movement of modern and contemporary architecture in Portugal. Grounded in the teaching at the Porto School of Fine Arts and the Porto School of Architecture, it is one of the most influential architectural movements in the history of Portuguese architecture. Its main figures, Fernando Távora, Álvaro Siza Vieira, and Eduardo Souto de Moura are some of the most globally renowned Portuguese architects.

The School is the foremost expression of modern architecture in Portugal. It is defined by the importance given to the contextualisation and integration of the functionalism and minimalism typical of modernism to the specific local and historical background of each work and to the roots of Portuguese traditional architecture. The first work unanimously attributed to the School was designed in 1953, but its origins can be traced from the beginning of the 20th century.

== Background ==
The teaching of architecture as an independent program in Porto begins in 1911, at the Porto School of Fine Arts (ESBAP). José Marques da Silva, one of the most renowned architects in the country in the beginning of the 20th century, was part of the faculty between 1906 and 1939, as well as the head of the institution for 15 years. He had an influence in the school through the importance given to drawing and its rigour as a tool of the creative process in Architecture, as well as to considerations of function and utility, a framework of teaching mostly influenced by his training in Fine Arts in Paris with Julien Guadet. However, his conception of Architecture was realised in his work and instruction somewhat anachronistically, detached of the revolution of the Modernists, which frequently undervalues his relevance as a forefather to the Porto School.

It is Carlos Ramos, a professor at ESBAP for thirty years and its leader between 1952 and 1967, who is credited as the "establisher of contemporaneity in the school', as stated by Álvaro Siza Vieira. Besides engraving a mindset of openness to artistic innovation and to the city of Porto itself, Carlos Ramos was also influential in bringing to ESBAP a faculty of artists who would go on to influence the following generations of architects and fine artists. Not withstanding the modernisation brought about by his time at ESBAP, Ramos did not abandon the core principles left by Marques da Silva, harnessing and developing the importance of drawing and the methodology of teaching as if in an atelier. However, he did not realise, either in his works or theoretical content, the paths of development of Portuguese architecture that his students would go on to trail. According to Fernando Távora, Carlos Ramos "liked to open up pathways more than pinpointing them".

== History ==
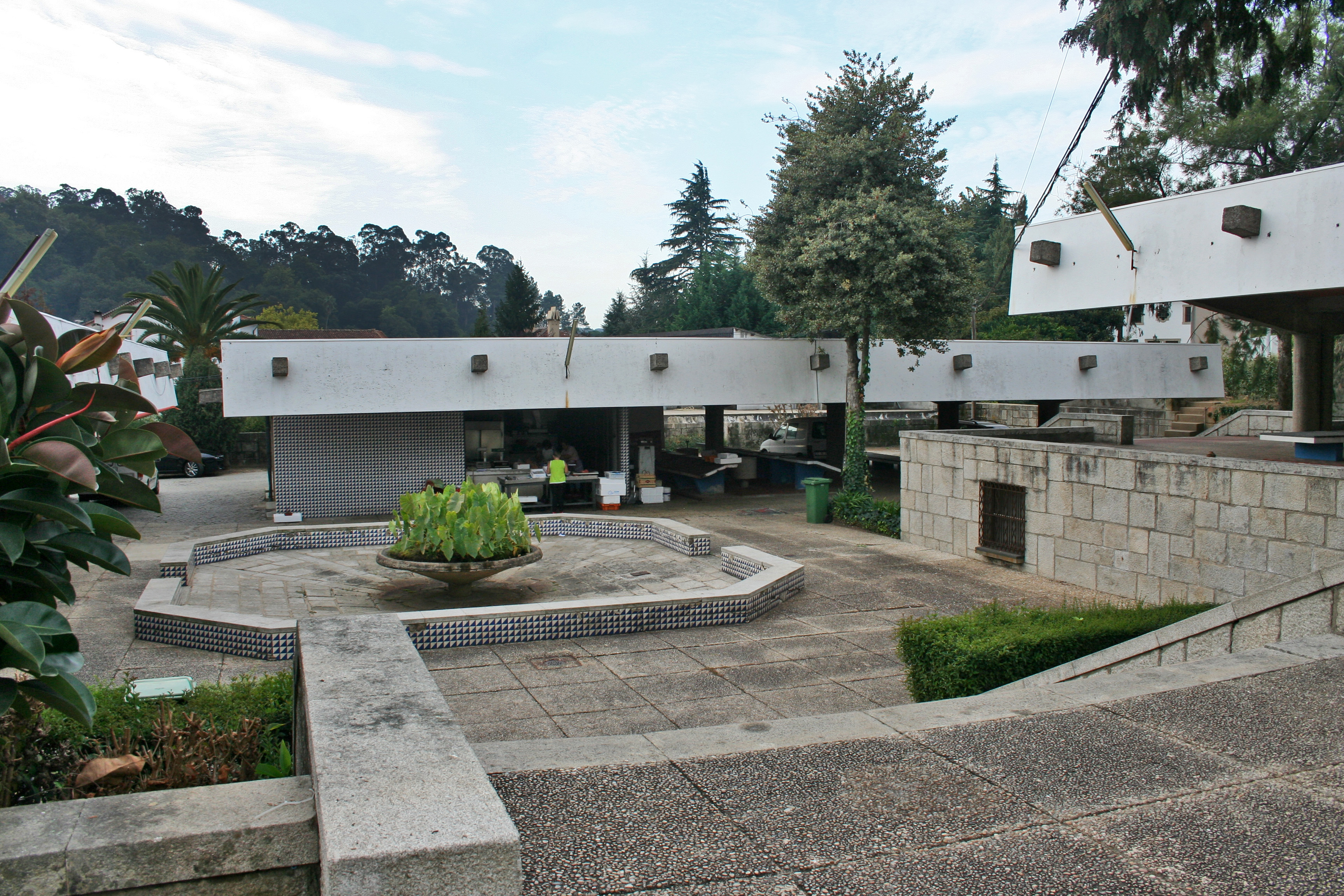
Santa Maria da Feira Municipal Market, designed by Fernando Távora

To Eduardo Souto de Moura, "Távora is the father of the Porto School, but the great-grandfather of Europe. He is an historical and universal figure". Fernando Távora entered ESBAP as an Architecture student in 1941, complementing it with a higher degree from 1945 onwards. In that time, he developed through essays a theoretical underpinning to his work which culminates in the design of the Santa Maria da Feira Municipal Market in 1953.

The building exemplifies his concern of developing and reconciling the radical tendencies of modernist architecture with the local and historical context, contributing to his defence of Architecture as an answer to the social needs of the "Man of today" and as a practice which inescapably exists in a given (social, economical, climatic) setting. The market can be understood as the first work belonging to the School – where the seeds are laid for Távora's following projects and for the genesis of the Porto School's identity.

Álvaro Siza Vieira interns with Távora between 1955 and 1958 after being his student at ESBAP. Siza remembers Távora as the first person in the school to recognise his talent – until then Siza describes his academic performance at the school as "very mediocre". From 1958 onwards he starts working on his own, designing three seminal projects at Leça da Palmeira(Casa de Chá da Boa Nova, Piscinas de Marés, swimming pool at Quinta da Conceição), some of them started while he worked under Távora.

In his early works Siza continues and expands the dialogue between modernist influences and traditional Portuguese architecture, as well as the importance of location and place to the exterior design of the building, although with some differences to Távora. With Siza, the contextualisation of the building does not necessarily mean a harmonisation with its surroundings. On the contrary, the exterior design is understood as the manifestation of an architect's attitude to those surroundings. When the site is deemed to possess a beauty and strength of its own, its impact on the landscape is minimised to an extreme (such as in the seaside Piscinas de Marés). When the site is deemed under or poorly developed, the building is markedly and visibly closed onto itself, with a greater attention given to its interior (such as in the Lordelo Cooperative or the Rocha Ribeiro House).

His individual evolution along with his growing international acclaim placed him on a different level compared to his contemporaries and lead him to a progressive distancing from ESBAP – he was hired as an assistant professor in 1966 but resigned in 1969 after Carlos Ramos's departure and the number of pedagogical and political crises that had plagued the institution. Ramos's death, along with the academic struggles of 1968 and 1969, lead the school to an artistic stagnation from which it only emerged after the Carnation Revolution of 1974, when the long-standing Estado Novo dictatorship was overthrown and the tension accumulated of years under the regime's oppression was released in the period that followed: the Processo Revolucionário Em Curso.

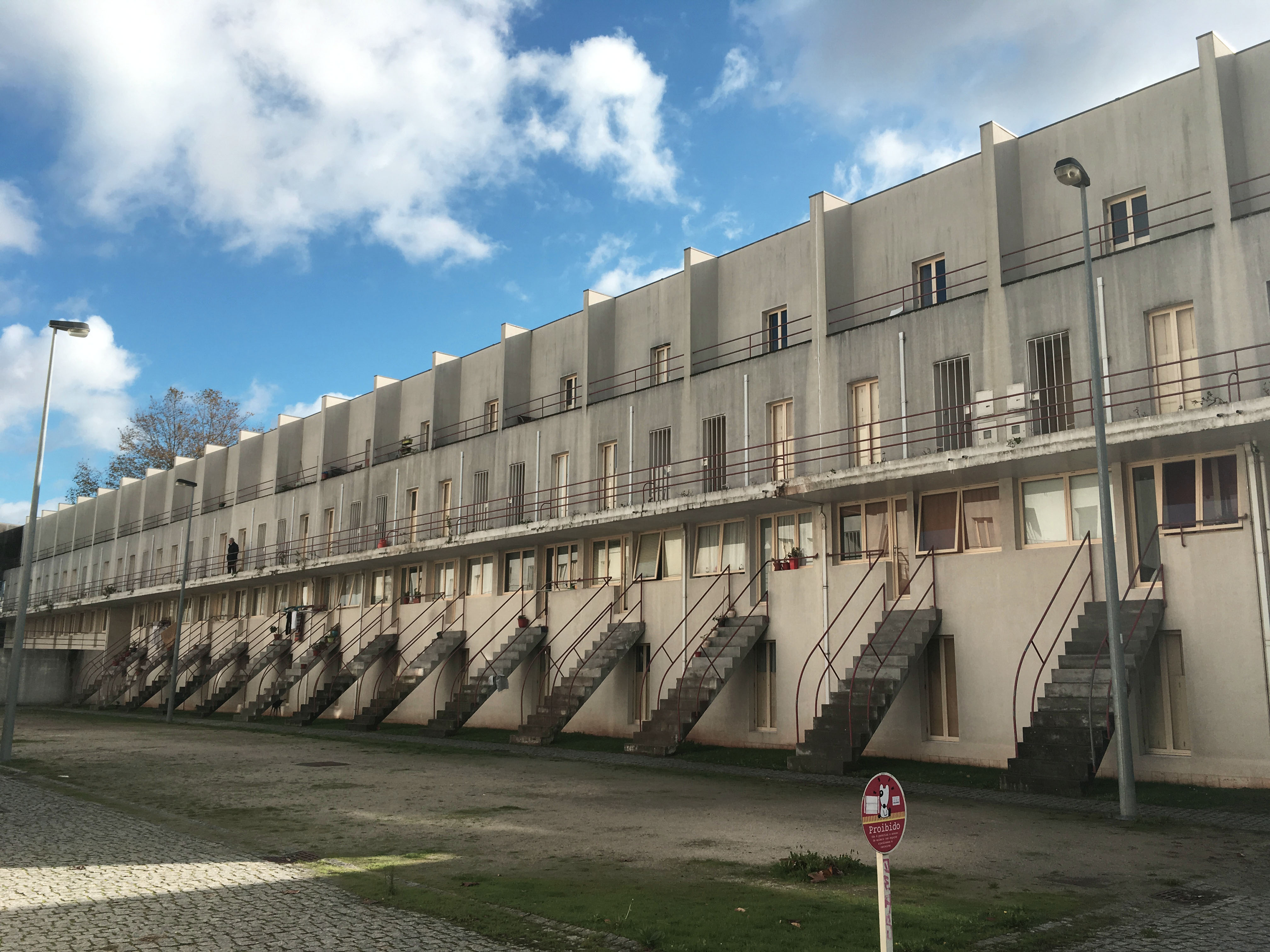
Bouça housing complex, designed by Álvaro Siza Vieira

The school's involvement in the Ambulatory Local Support Service (Serviço de Apoio Ambulatório Local in Portuguese, or simply SAAL) was a crucial moment for the Porto School. SAAL was a state programme for the construction of social housing created after the revolution that set out to answer the pressing housing needs of disadvantaged populations in Portugal. Its methodology of direct interaction between crews of architects and the target population organised in residents' associations makes it a unique moment in the history of Portuguese architecture and a worldwide reference in the field. The restraints caused by the country's poor economic situation and the service's own fragile financial status were well suited to the school's modernist attitude towards rationality and functionalism. The main mark left on the city by the programme was the Bouça housing complex, by Álvaro Siza Vieira.

The involvement of architects trained (or in training) at ESBAP in the SAAL crews meant a change of scale from what they usually worked in. The Porto School's approach had always found better refuge in smaller, less complex projects, where the desired intimate relationship with location and with traditional Portuguese architecture. SAAL's scale was larger, however – 11,500 homes were planned to be built across 33 different sites in the city. The substantial strength of residents' associations in Porto during the post-revolutionary period made possible the ambition that SAAL would build more than just homes – parks, nursery schools, and other collective use facilities were beginning to be thought of purely through the interaction between architects and residents. The socialist and revolutionary character of SAAL was openly stated by those involved. The defeat of this political doctrine after the events of 25 November 1975, eased the dismantling of the programme and the consequent interruption of many of its operations – only 370 homes were eventually built in Porto.

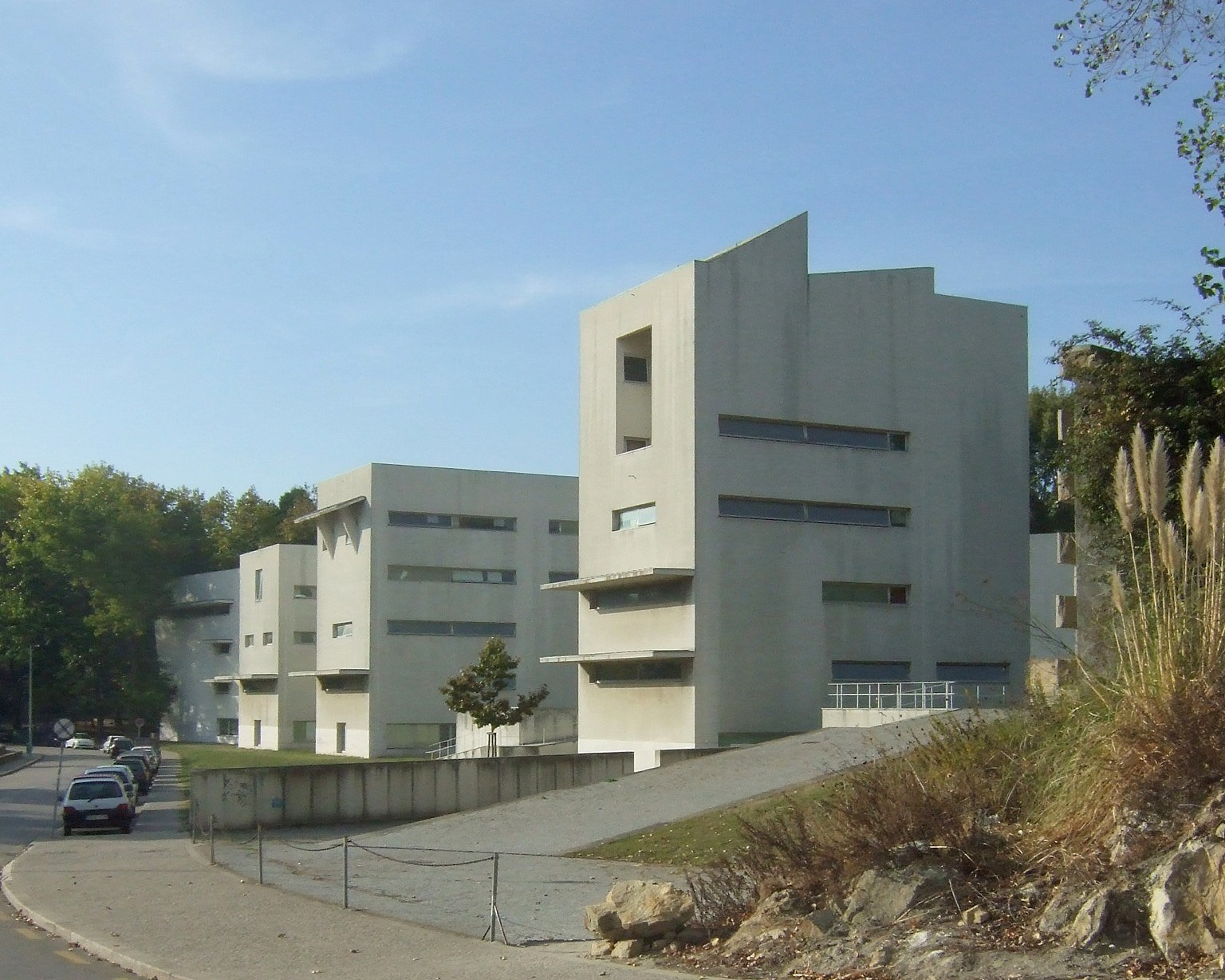
Porto School of Architecture, designed by Álvaro Siza Vieira

This process left lasting marks at ESBAP and the School's collective identity, which had found in SAAL an essential reason for its own existence. The widespread development of the role of the private sector in housing from the 1980s onwards favoured generally stereotypical and repetitive construction, usually of tower blocks detached from its surroundings. The main architects from Porto, rejecting this general tendency, only found opportunities to work in Portugal on the design of upper class housing and public buildings.

Also in the 1980s the Architecture course at the School of Fine Arts was transferred to a new institution part of the University of Porto, the Faculty of Architecture. The new site was designed by Álvaro Siza Vieira and is located in the Campo Alegre Campus of the university, in a panoramic setting over the river Douro. The new school synthesises the main aspects of the School, with its location overlooking the river and next to a 19th-century house taken fully advantage of and incorporated into the project.

== Legacy ==
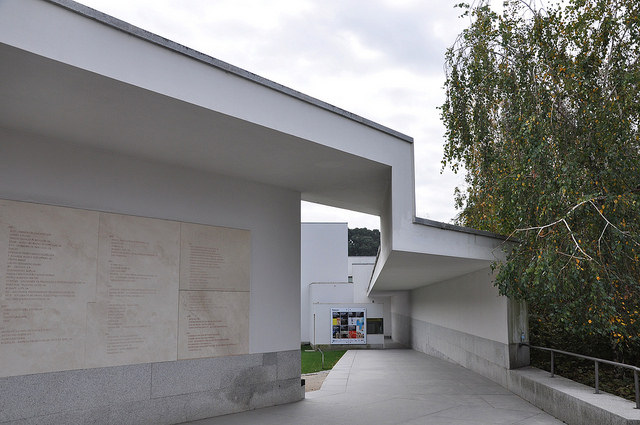
Serralves Museum of Contemporary Art, designed by Álvaro Siza Vieira

The impact of the Porto School continues to be felt in the city by works such as the Serralves Museum of Contemporary Art (by Siza Vieira), the Porto Metro (stations mostly designed by Souto de Moura), the renovated Aliados Avenue in central Porto (Siza Vieira and Souto de Moura), and the refurbishments of the Palácio do Freixo and the Casa dos 24 (Fernando Távora).

The Architecture course at the Faculty of Architecture continues to be one of the most sought out degrees in the country due to its reputation and teaching methods, having the highest entry bar in the country in its field. Faculty of FAUP have also taken part in the creation of Architecture degrees at the universities in Coimbra and Minho in the 1990s.

Álvaro Siza Vieira, in 1992, and Eduardo Souto de Moura, in 2011, were awarded with the Pritzker Prize, often considered the "Nobel Prize of Architecture".

== Notable architects ==
Some of the Porto School's main architects:

- Adalberto Dias
- Alcino Soutinho
- Alexandre Alves Costa
- Álvaro Siza Vieira
- Arménio Losa
- Eduardo Souto de Moura
- Fernando Távora
- Pedro Ramalho
- Sérgio Fernandez
- Viana de Lima
