= Nuno Portas =

Portuguese architect (1934–2025)

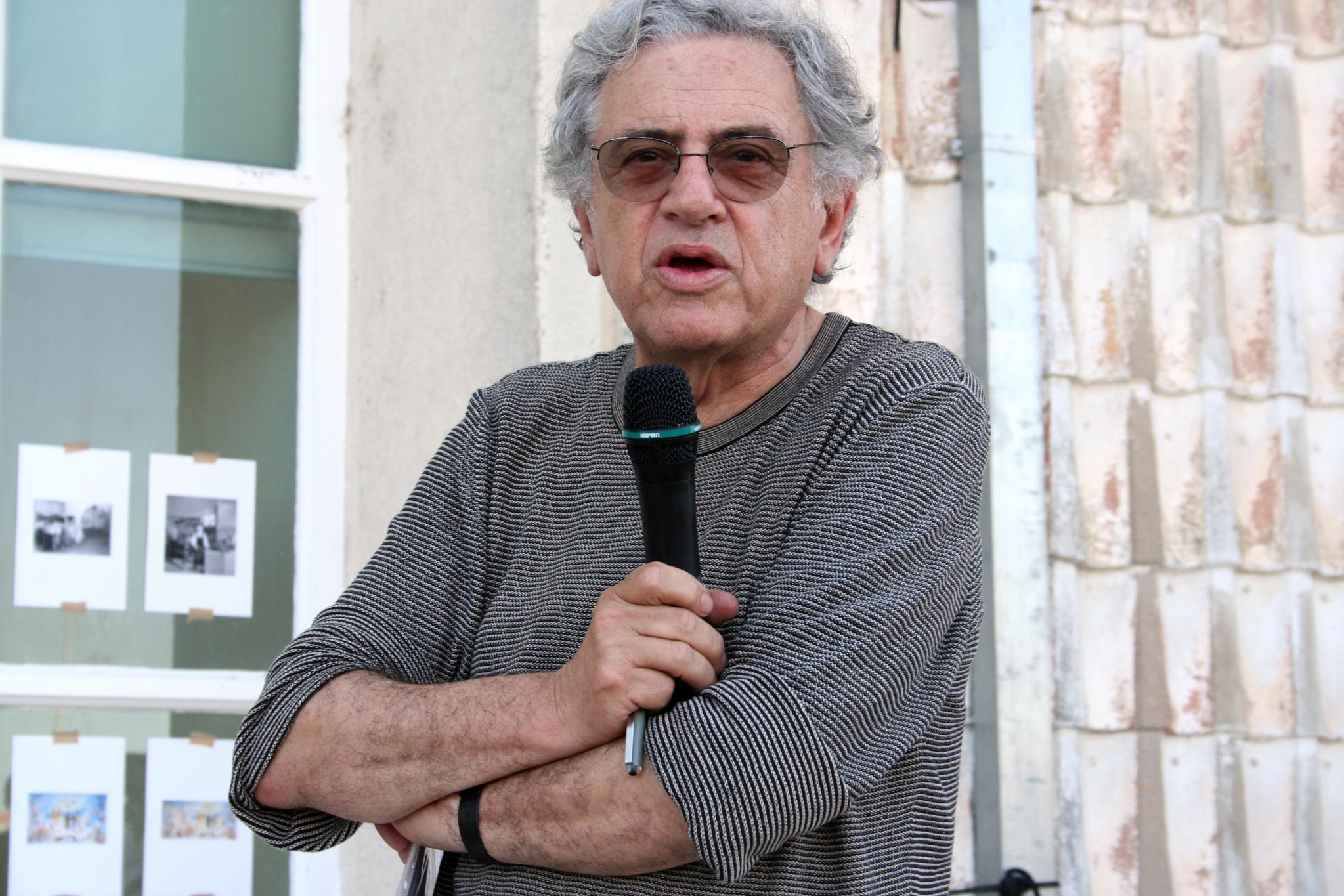
Nuno Portas

Nuno Rodrigo Martins Portas (23 September 1934 – 27 July 2025) was a Portuguese architect.

== Life and career ==
Portas was born in Vila Viçosa on 23 September 1934, to engineer Leopoldo Barreiro Portas, of Galician descent, and his wife Umbelina do Carmo das Neves Martins. He studied with the Jesuits at the Nun'Alvares Institute, in Caldas da Saúde, Santo Tirso.

In 1974 he received the Valmor Prize, for the work of the Church of the Heart of Jesus, in Lisbon, with Nuno Teotónio Pereira. He was also the coordinator of the team of architects responsible for the expansion of the campus of the University of Aveiro, consultant for the land use plans of the Municipalities of Vale do Ave, responsible for the first general plan of Expo 98 and the terms of reference for the design and urbanization competition of Chelas, in Lisbon, and consultant for the rehabilitation of the historic center of Guimarães.

Internationally, he coordinated the Intermunicipal Planning of Madrid, was a consultant for the Metropolitan Strategic Plan of Barcelona, the Land Use Plan of Santiago de Compostela, as well as for the United Nations and the European Union, for urban planning and research issues. With Oriol Bohigas, he was the author of the Seafront and Ferry Station Plan (1997–2000) and the Central Zone Recovery Plan (1995–2000) for Rio de Janeiro. He also participated in the elaboration of urban legislation in Cape Verde.

He was awarded the Grand Cross of the Order of Prince Henry the Navigator on 18 October 2004.

Portas died in Lisbon on 27 July 2025, at the age of 90.
