= Museum of Transport and Communication =

Transport museum in Porto, Portugal

Coordinates: 41.1431°N 8.6216°W

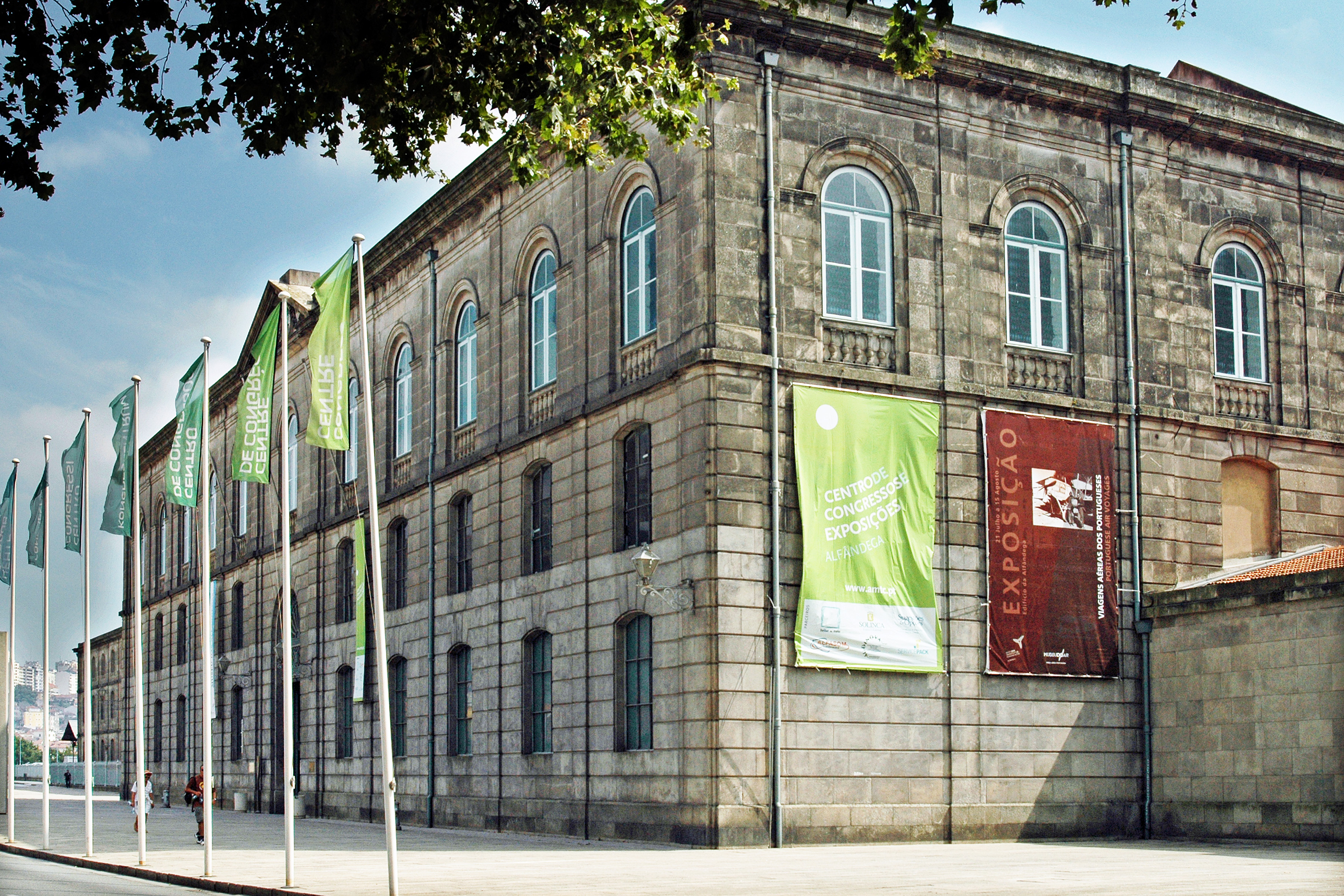
Alfândega Nova main entrance

The Museum of Transport and Communication (Portuguese: Museu dos Transportes e Comunicações) is a museum in Porto, northern Portugal, founded in 1992. The museum is located in the Alfandega Nova building (the New Customs House), dating from 1860, located beside the Douro River.

The museum is focused on the history of transport and communication in Portugal and its collection comprises a diverse repertoire of cars, with a special focus on presidential vehicles. It was nominated for the European Museum of the Year Award 2014.

== See also ==
- Alfândega Porto Congress Centre
