= Eduardo Souto de Moura =

Portuguese architect (born 1952)

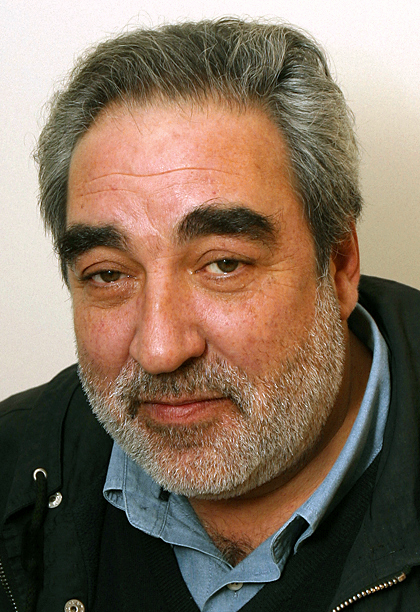
- Eduardo Souto de Moura
- Born: 25 July 1952 (age 74); Porto, Portugal
- Education: University of Porto
- Occupation: Architect
- Awards: Pessoa Prize (1998); Pritzker Architecture Prize (2011)
- Buildings: Estádio Municipal de Braga

Eduardo Elísio Machado Souto de Moura (Portuguese pronunciation: [eˈðwaɾðu ˈsotu ðɨ ˈmoɾɐ]; born 25 July 1952), better known as Eduardo Souto de Moura, is a Portuguese architect who was the recipient of the Pritzker Architecture Prize in 2011 and the Wolf Prize in Arts in 2013. Along with Fernando Távora and Álvaro Siza, he is one of the alumni of the Porto School of Architecture, where he was appointed a professor.

== Life and career ==
=== Family ===
Souto de Moura is the son of medical doctor José Alberto Souto de Moura and wife Maria Teresa Ramos Machado. His brother is José Souto de Moura, former 9th Attorney-General of Portugal.

=== Education ===
Souto de Moura was born in Porto, and studied sculpture before switching to architecture at the School of Fine Arts of the University of Porto, the current FAUP – Faculdade de Arquitectura da Universidade do Porto, and receiving his degree in 1980. From 1974 to 1979 he worked with Álvaro Siza Vieira at his architectural practice, who encouraged him to start his own firm.

=== Early career ===
Souto de Moura began his career as an independent architect in 1980, after winning a design competition for the Casa das Artes, a cultural center with an auditorium and an exhibition gallery in the gardens of a neo-classical mansion, in his native city of Porto. However, Souto de Moura collaborated with Siza on the Portuguese pavilion at the Expo 2000 in Hanover, Germany, and Serpentine Gallery's annual summer pavilion in 2004.

Souto de Moura's early commissions were often modest residential houses, mainly in his native country. Later, he was commissioned with shopping centers, schools, art galleries, and a cinema, in countries including Spain, Italy, Germany, the United Kingdom, and Switzerland. Between 1989 and 1997, Souto de Moura spent eight years on the restoration of Santa Maria do Bouro, a half-destroyed 12th-century monastery in Amares, transforming it into a Pousada.

From 1981 to 1990, Souto de Moura was an assistant professor at his alma mater, and was later appointed Professor at the Faculty of Architecture at the University of Porto. He has been a visiting professor at the architectural schools of Geneva, Paris-Belleville, Harvard University, Dublin, ETH Zurich and EPFL Lausanne, and has participated in numerous seminars and given many lectures both in Portugal and abroad. His work has appeared in various publications and exhibitions.

== Recognition ==
Paula Rego Museum, Cascais

On 28 March 2011 it was announced that Moura was the 2011 Pritzker Prize winner, architecture's highest honor. He was the second Portuguese architect to win the honor, after Álvaro Siza. The prize was supposed to be presented in April in Washington DC but the winner was prematurely leaked by a Spanish news organisation. The prize was awarded for his work including Estádio Municipal de Braga, the Burgo Tower in Porto and the Paula Rego Museum in Cascais. On 3 January 2012, it was announced Moura was the 2013 Wolf Prize in Arts winner along with Robert S. Langer.

He has been also awarded the Pessoa prize in 1998, the António de Almeida Foundation prize, the Antero de Quental Foundation prize, first prize in the competition for the restoration of Giraldo Square in Évora, Portugal, first prize in the competition for the CIAC Pavilions, first prize in the competition for a hotel in Salzburg, Austria, first prize in the "IN/ARCH 1990 for Sicily" Competition, the Secil Prize for Architecture, second prize in the "Architecture and Stone" ideas competition, honourable mention for his Miramar House in the Secil Architectural Prizes, and honourable mention for both the SEC Cultural Centre and the Alcanena House in the National Architectural Prizes. On 14 July 2011, Souto de Mouro received an Honoris Causa doctorate by the Faculty of Architecture and Arts at the Lusíada University of Porto.

In 2025 Souto de Moura won the prestigious Praemium Imperiale award in the category 'Architecture'.

== Works ==
Souto de Moura's works include:

- 1980-84 Braga Municipal Market
- 1981-91 Casa das Artes, Porto
- 1982-85 House 1 in Nevogilde, Porto
- 1983-85 House 2 in Nevogilde, Porto
- 1984-89 House in Quinta do Lago, Almancil
- 1985 Ponte dell'Accademia, Venice Biennal, Venice, Italy
- 1986-88 Annexes to a house on Rua da Vilarinha, Porto
- 1987-92 House in Alcanena
- 1987-89 Hotel in Salzburg, Austria
- 1987 Detail Plan for Porta dei Colli, Milan Triennal, Palermo, Italy
- 1987-91 House in Miramar, Vila Nova de Gaia
- 1987-94 House on Avenida da Boavista, Porto
- 1988 Detail Plan and facilities for Mondello, Palermo, Italy
- 1989-97 Renovation and conversion of Santa Maria do Bouro Convent into a Pousada, Amares
- 1989-94 House at the Bom Jesus, Braga
- 1990-94 Geosciences building at the Aveiro University, Aveiro
- 1990-93 House in Maia
- 1990-93 House in Baião
- 1991-95 House in Tavira
- 1991 Burgo Empreendimento office buildings and commercial mall on Avenida da Boavista, Porto
- 1991-98 House in Moledo, Caminha
- 1992-95 Housing block on Rua do Teatro, Porto
- 1992-01 Children's Library and Auditorium for the Municipal Library of Porto, Porto
- 1993 Remodeling and valorisation of the Grão Vasco Museum, Viseu
- 1993-99 Courtyard houses in Matosinhos
- 1993 Conversion of the Customs Building into the Museum of Transport and Communication, Porto
- 1994-02 House in Serra da Arrábida
- 1994-02 House in Cascais
- 1994-01 Three houses on Praça de Liége, Porto
- 1995 Detail Plan for Novo Centro Direccional, Maia
- 1995 Conversion of the South Matosinhos coastal promenade, Matosinhos
- 2000-03 Estádio Municipal de Braga
- 2004 Porto Metro
- 2005 Serpentine Gallery pavilion, London (with Alvaro Siza)
- 2007 Burgo Empreendimento office buildings, Avenida da Boavista, Porto
- 2008 Contemporary Arts Center Graça Morais
- 2009 Casa das Histórias Paula Rego
- 2010–2011 Crematory in Courtrai (Kortrijk), Belgium
- 2022 Bruges Meeting & Convention Center Bruges Belgium
- 2024 Crematory in Evere, Belgium
