= Fernando Távora =

Portuguese architect and academic (1923–2005)

Fernando Luís Cardoso de Meneses de Tavares e Távora, ComSE, simply known as Fernando Távora (August 25, 1923, in Porto – September 3, 2005, in Matosinhos), was a renowned Portuguese architect and professor.

== Biography ==
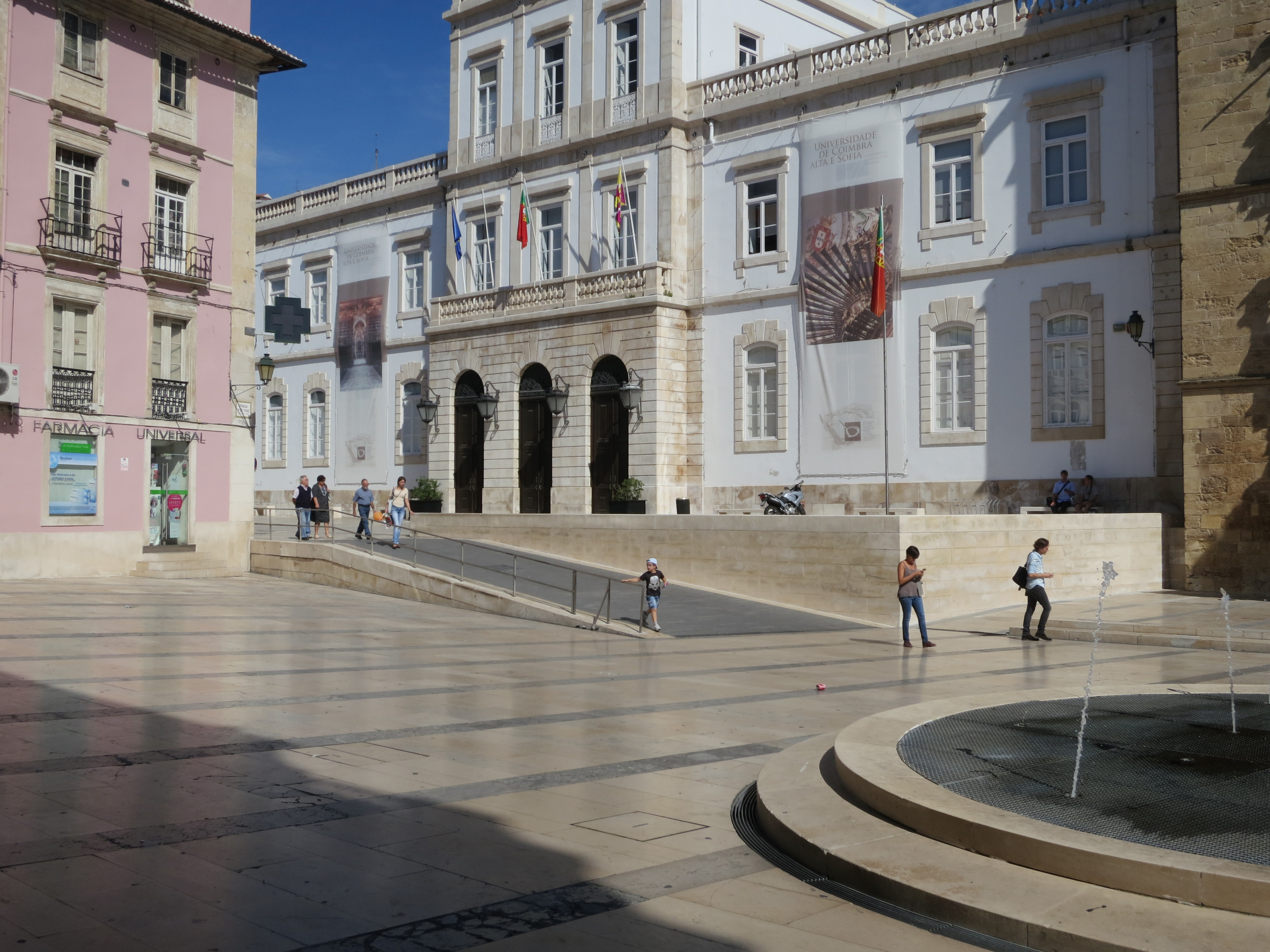
Praça 8 de Maio in Coimbra, renovation by Fernando Távora c. 2002

The sixth of seven children and third of three sons of José Pinto Tavares de Mendonça Ferrão or José Ferrão de Tavares e Távora and wife Maria José do Amaral Ferrão Lobo Machado or Maria José Lobo de Sousa Machado Cardoso de Meneses, of the Viscounts of Paço de Nespereira, he inherited from his mother the House of Covilhã. He graduated in architecture from the Porto School of Fine Arts (which later became the school of architecture of the University of Porto) in 1952. Having sat the examination in Fine Composition for Professor of Architecture, he was later invited to become a Professor at the school. Participating in several Congrès International d'Architecture Moderne (CIAM) and Team 10 meetings, he became a key person in the modernization of the Porto School. Two of his former students, Álvaro Siza (who also worked in his architecture office) and Eduardo Souto de Moura, have been awarded the Pritzker Architecture Prize.

Later on, Távora became "President of the Ad Hoc Committee of the Faculty of Architecture at the University of Porto" and university professor at the same faculty, as well as professor of the Department of Architecture at the Faculty of Sciences and Technology of the University of Coimbra. He took part in the late 1950s "Survey on Portuguese Architecture" and was the author of several essays, namely "O Problema da Casa Portuguesa" (Lisbon, 1947) and "Da Organização do Espaço" (Porto, 1962 and 1982). One of his most important works in the 1980s was the renovation and extension of the Pousada de Guimarães, a former convent which at the time was transformed into the Sta. Marinha Historic Hotel.

Besides his academic career, Távora worked as an architect for Porto Town Council, consultant to Vila Nova de Gaia Town Council, consultant in the "Commissariat on the Urban Renovation of the Ribeira/Barredo" (Porto) project, consultant in the "Technical Bureau of the Northern Planning Commission", and consultant in the "Local Technical Bureau of Guimarães Town Council".

== Works (selected) ==
- Summer House at Ofir
- Vila da Feira Municipal Market
- Quinta da Conceicao Municipal Parc in Leça da Palmeira
- Quinta da Conceicao Tennis Pavilion in Leça da Palmeira
- Santa Marinha Convent in Guimarães
- General urban plan of Guimarães
- Renovation of the Soares dos Reis National Museum in Porto
- Renovation of the Praça 8 de Maio in Coimbra

== Recognition ==
Távora's work was exhibited at exhibitions around the world, including the Smithsonian Institution, Washington; "Artes Plásticas I and II" at the Calouste Gulbenkian Foundation, Lisbon; "Eleven Architects from Oporto", Lisbon; "Architectures à Porto", Clemont Ferrand; Europália 1991, Brussels; and the Venice Biennial. The Fernando Távora Architecture prize (Portuguese: Prémio Fernando Távora de Arquitetura) of the Portuguese Architects Association is named after him.

== Awards ==
He was granted a scholarship by the Calouste Gulbenkian Foundation and the Institute for Culture in the United States and Japan in 1960. He was awarded several prizes in architecture, as well as the Golden Medal of the city of Porto and the Order of St James of the Sword. The University of Coimbra awarded him a Doctor Honoris Causa.

== See also ==
- Portuguese architecture
