= Paredes Municipal Chamber =

Legislative body of Paredes

Coordinates: 41.20870°N 8.33370°W

Paredes Municipal Chamber Câmara Municipal de Paredes
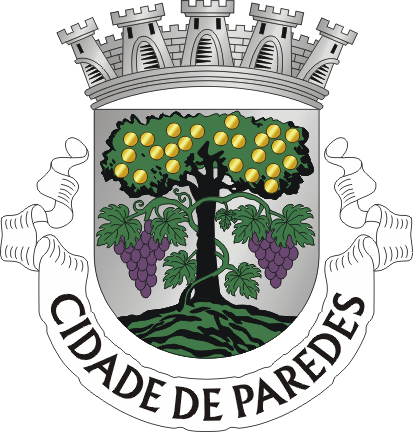
- Coat of arms of the city of Paredes

Type
- Type: Câmara municipal
- Term limits: 3

History
- Founded: 1836; 189 years ago

Leadership
- President: Alexandre Almeida, PS since 20 October 2021
- Vice President: Paulo Silva, PS since 20 October 2021

Structure
- Seats: 9
- Political groups: Municipal Executive (7) PS (7) Opposition (2) PSD (2)
- Length of term: Four years

Elections
- Last election: 26 September 2021
- Next election: Sometime between 22 September and 14 October 2025

Meeting place
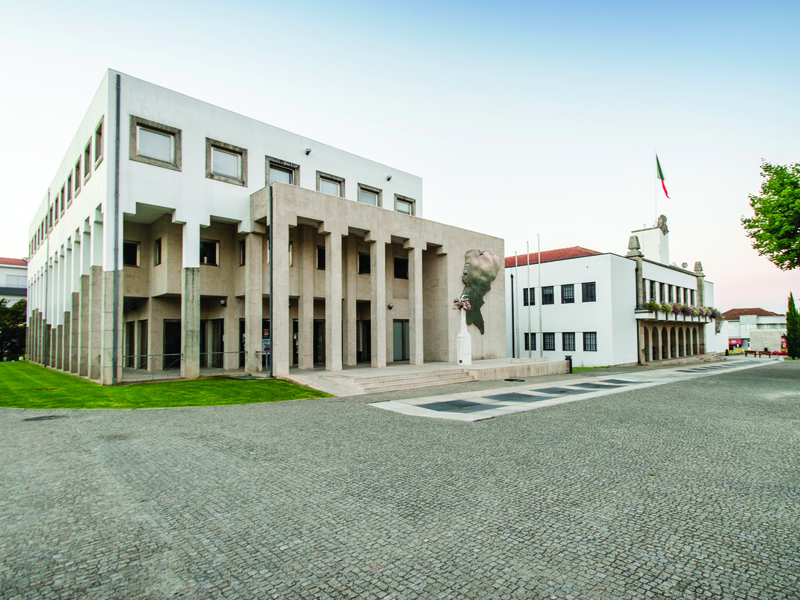
- Paços do Concelho de Paredes

Website
- www.cm-paredes.pt

The Paredes Municipal Chamber (Portuguese: Câmara Municipal de Paredes) is the administrative authority in the municipality of Paredes. It has 18 freguesias in its area of jurisdiction and is based in the city of Paredes, on the Porto District. These freguesias are: Aguiar de Sousa, Astromil, Baltar, Beire, Cete, Cristelo, Duas Igrejas, Gandra, Lordelo, Louredo, Parada de Todeia, Paredes, Rebordosa, Recarei, Sobreira, Sobrosa, Vandoma and Vilela.

The Paredes City Council is made up of 9 councillors, representing, currently, two different political forces. The first candidate on the list with the most votes in a municipal election or, in the event of a vacancy, the next candidate on the list, takes office as President of the Municipal Chamber.

== List of the Presidents of the Municipal Chamber of Paredes ==
- Francisco Ribeiro da Mato – (1976–1977)
- Jorge Maria Malheiro – (1977-1993)
- José Granja da Fonseca – (1993–2005)
- Celso Gomes Ferreira – (2005–2017)
- Alexandre Almeida – (2017–2025)
