= Tâmega Subregion =

Coordinates: 41°12′N 8°17′W

Map showing the location of the Tâmega subregion

Tâmega Subregion (European Portuguese pronunciation: [ˈtɐmɨɣɐ]) is a former NUTS3 subregion, part of the NUTS2 region of Norte Region, Portugal. It was abolished at the January 2015 NUTS 3 revision. Its name derives from the Tâmega River that crosses through the subregion. With 558,000 inhabitants (2005) it is the fourth most populated subregion in Portugal. It has several important urban centers - Paços de Ferreira (pop. 41,000), Lousada (pop. 25,000), Penafiel (24,000), Paredes and Felgueiras (pop. 21,000) - being one of the most decentralized of the Portuguese subregions. The chief city is Penafiel. Other important cities are: Amarante, Felgueiras, Freamunde, Gandra, Lixa, Marco de Canaveses, Paços de Ferreira, Paredes, Rebordosa and São Salvador de Lordelo. Important towns: Baião, Cabeceiras de Basto, Castelo de Paiva (Sobrado), Cinfães, Lousada, Resende, Ribeira de Pena and Vila Meã.

The main economical activities are centered on light industry, furniture, agriculture and wine.

It covers an area of 2,631 km^{2} with a density of 212 inhabitants/km^{2}. Main rivers: Douro River, Tâmega River and Sousa River.

== Municipalities ==
The 15 municipalities that comprise the subregion are:

- Amarante
- Baião
- Cabeceiras de Basto
- Castelo de Paiva
- Celorico de Basto
- Cinfães
- Felgueiras
- Lousada
- Marco de Canaveses
- Mondim de Basto
- Paços de Ferreira
- Paredes
- Penafiel
- Resende
- Ribeira de Pena
