= Rafa Sousa =

Portuguese footballer

Personal information
- Full name: Abílio Rafael Barbosa de Sousa
- Date of birth: 25 June 1988 (age 38)
- Place of birth: Cete, Portugal
- Height: 1.86 m (6 ft 1 in)
- Position: Midfielder

Youth career
- 1998–2003: Porto
- 2003–2007: Penafiel

Senior career*
Years	Team	Apps	(Gls)
2007–2013	Penafiel	122	(5)
2013–2014	Nacional	17	(0)
2014–2015	Penafiel	22	(0)
2015–2016	Moreirense	6	(0)
2016–2021	Penafiel	97	(5)
2021–2022	Vila Meã	8	(0)
2022–2025	Cete	82	(6)
Total		354	(16)

International career
2009	Portugal U21	1	(0)
- * Club domestic league appearances and goals

Abílio Rafael 'Rafa' Barbosa de Sousa (born 25 June 1988 in Cete, Paredes) is a Portuguese former professional footballer who played as a midfielder.
