= Baltar (Paredes) =

- Civil parish
- Location in Portugal
- Coordinates: 41.193°N 8.388°W
- Country: Portugal
- Region: Norte
- Metropolitan area: Porto
- District: Porto
- Municipality: Paredes

Area
  - Total: 7.41 km^{2} (2.86 sq mi)

Population (2011)
  - Total: 4,818
  - Density: 650/km^{2} (1,700/sq mi)
- Time zone: UTC+00:00 (WET)
  - Summer (DST): UTC+01:00 (WEST)

Baltar is a parish in Paredes Municipality in Portugal. The population as of the 2021 census was 4,720, down from 4,818, in 2011. It covers an area of 7.41 km².
