= Beire (Paredes) =

- Civil parish
- Location in Portugal
- Coordinates: 41.246°N 8.319°W
- Country: Portugal
- Region: Norte
- Metropolitan area: Porto
- District: Porto
- Municipality: Paredes

Area
  - Total: 3.31 km^{2} (1.28 sq mi)

Population (2011)
  - Total: 2,040
  - Density: 620/km^{2} (1,600/sq mi)
- Time zone: UTC+00:00 (WET)
  - Summer (DST): UTC+01:00 (WEST)

Beire is a Portuguese parish of the municipality of Paredes. The population in 2011 was 2,040, in an area of 3.31 km².
