= Novum Canal =

- Country: Portugal
- Headquarters: Paredes, Porto metropolitan area

Programming
- Language: Portuguese

History
- Launched: 2019

Links
- Website: novumnoticias.pt

Novum Canal is a Portuguese television channel broadcasting from the Porto metropolitan area, out of Paredes, primarily serving Northern Portugal.

== History ==
Novum Canal was launched in 2019, to serve the audience of Northern Portugal.

In July 2019, Novum Canal was the victim of a cyber attack that stole hours of content from the program Datavénia, a show that breaks down legal matters for a non-legal audience.

== Programming ==
In terms of content the channel airs regionally-oriented programming, alongside generalist content and opinion journalism.

Regional focus is on Northern Portugal and, in particular, the Porto metropolitan area, and the nearby municipalities of Paços de Ferreira, Penafiel, Marco de Canaveses, Lousada, Castelo de Paiva, and Felgueiras.

Major programming

- Jornal Diário
- Mundo em Português
- Hoje á Norte
- Democracia em Debate
- Datavénia
- Cortar a Direito
- Virar à Esquerda

- Raiz da Questão
- Especial Informação
- Informação Semenal
- É Psicológico
- Fiel à Mesa
- Pandemónio
- La Vie en Rose Gold
