= Rebordosa =

- Civil parish
- Location in Portugal
- Coordinates: 41.220°N 8.412°W
- Country: Portugal
- Region: Norte
- Metropolitan area: Porto
- District: Porto
- Municipality: Paredes

Area
  - Total: 10.76 km^{2} (4.15 sq mi)

Population (2011)
  - Total: 9,106
  - Density: 846.3/km^{2} (2,192/sq mi)
- Time zone: UTC+00:00 (WET)
  - Summer (DST): UTC+01:00 (WEST)
- Postal code: 4585
- Area code: 224
- Website: http://www.jf-rebordosa.pt/

Rebordosa (Portuguese pronunciation: [ʁɨβuɾˈðɔzɐ]) is a civil parish in the municipality of Paredes, in the northern subregion of Tâmega. The population in 2011 was 9,106, in an area of 10.76 km^{2}. It is approximately 20 kilometres (12 mi) east of the centre of Porto.

== History ==
The first reference to Rebordosa appeared in during the inquiries of 1258, referring to the territorial area of the Villa. There continues to be some discussion as to the etymology of the location's name; the prevailing opinion theorizes that the name derived from "rebolosa", from "reboleiros", a Portuguese species of wild chestnuts, which are "rebordans" or "round". This was likely due to the number of wild chestnuts that were abundant in the region.

=== Kingdom ===
A later official document referred to the area as the parish of São Miguel de Rebordosa, which was administered by an abbey of the Casa de Penaguião (25 November 1513). It was later included in the foral (charter) for Aguiar de Sousa, by King Manuel I of Portugal.

Later (1839) it was included in the comarca of Penafiel, but eventually annexed to the municipality of Paredes in 1884. Ecclesiastically, it was part of the extinct bishopric of Penafiel, archdeaconry of Aguiar de Sousa in the 12th century, the eclisastical comarca of Penafiel (between 1856 and 1907) and the vicarage of Paços de Ferreira (between 1916 and 1970).

Since the Middle Ages, these forests have been responsible for a parallel industry to agriculture that occur in the lowlands and plains: the production of wood furniture, consequently, has been important to the success of its local economy. Until the economic leap at the middle of the 20th century, the region was primarily responsible for herding and small agriculture, resulting in the proliferation of flour mills until about 1922.

At the beginning of the 19th century, Rebordosa was the stage for violent battles between Liberal and Absolutist forces, becoming celebrated for his anti-liberal sermons, Father Alvito Buela Pereira de Miranda.

=== Republic ===
By 1935, Rebordosa began to figure in the economic development of the nation, and be known as the birthplace of furniture.

Although the region demonstrated a persistence, this was increasingly affected by regional forest fires. Also, in the first 10 years of the 21st century, the industry lost 13000 saw-milling and furniture-making jobs.

Town since 16 May 1984, Rebordosa was elevated to the status of city on 1 July 2003, under decree 72/2003 (26 August 2003), published in the Diário da República 196 Série I-A.

== Geography ==
The history of Rebordosa is linked to the geomorphological characteristics and flora of the localities: the small quartze mountains, with its acid soils, rich is potassium, iron and aluminium, created conditions for a large forested matte. This raw, tall and robust forest, includes species of pine, oak, salgueiro and eyucalptus.

Rebordosa's urban core is one of the four cities that exist in the municipality of Paredes (the others being Paredes, Gandra and Lordelo.

== Economy ==
From the testament of one of the region's founding father, Joaquim Moreira dos Santos, the transformation the region's economy came from the introductions of an Italian/Sicilian who settled in the 1920s, marrying a woman from Santa Luzia. From this marriage three children were born, who were known as the Sesilas, many of which have descendants still living in the region. This activity had an important impact on the local economy, with many of the families responsible for wood carving and carpentry selling their wares in the town (the women transporting chairs on their heads). The sector's worse period occurred after 1914, with the First World War and emigration to Brazil. But, by 1922, small businesses began to export to Lisbon and Porto, demonstrating a special quality in handicraft.

Rebordosa occupies a place at the centre of the Portuguese furniture making industry; the Centro de Formação Profissional das Indústrias da Madeira e Mobiliário (Professional Woodwork & Furniture Industry Training Centre), also known as FPIMM, is located in Rebordosa, as are several furniture outlets and factories.

== Culture ==
The city festival occurs annually on the first Sunday in July.
