= Astromil =

- Civil parish
- Location in Portugal
- Coordinates: 41.199°N 8.417°W
- Country: Portugal
- Region: Norte
- Metropolitan area: Porto
- District: Porto
- Municipality: Paredes

Area
  - Total: 1.93 km^{2} (0.75 sq mi)

Population (2011)
  - Total: 1,086
  - Density: 560/km^{2} (1,500/sq mi)
- Time zone: UTC+00:00 (WET)
  - Summer (DST): UTC+01:00 (WEST)

Astromil is a Portuguese parish of the municipality of Paredes. The population in 2011 was 1,086, in an area of 1.93 km^{2}.
