= Lordelo =

Lordelo may refer to:

== Places in Portugal ==
- Lordelo (Paredes), also known as São Salvador de Lordelo, a town in Paredes
  - Aliados Lordelo F.C., football team in Lordelo (Paredes)
- Lordelo do Ouro e Massarelos (formerly Lordelo do Ouro), a parish in Porto

== People ==
- Henrique Lordelo (born 2000), Portuguese footballer
