= Recarei =

- Civil parish
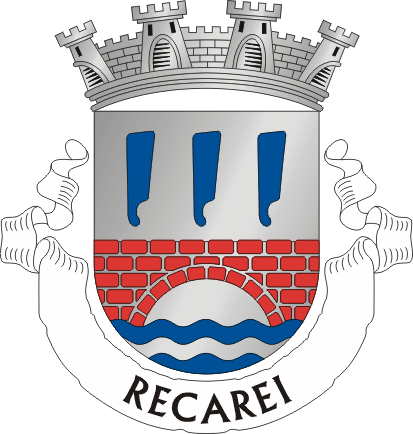
- Coat of arms

- Location in Portugal
- Coordinates: 41.160°N 8.425°W
- Country: Portugal
- Region: Norte
- Metropolitan area: Porto
- District: Porto
- Municipality: Paredes

Area
  - Total: 14.60 km^{2} (5.64 sq mi)

Population (2011)
  - Total: 4,631
  - Density: 320/km^{2} (820/sq mi)
- Time zone: UTC+00:00 (WET)
  - Summer (DST): UTC+01:00 (WEST)

Recarei is a town in the Porto district of Portugal which forms part of the municipality of Paredes. The population in 2011 was 4,631, in an area of 14.60 km^{2} (5.64 sq mi). It has the administrative status of a freguesia or parish.
