= Cete, Portugal =

Cete
- Civil parish
- Location in Portugal
- Coordinates: 41.18°N 8.35°W
- Country: Portugal
- Region: Norte
- Metropolitan area: Porto
- District: Porto
- Municipality: Paredes

Area
  - Total: 4.68 km^{2} (1.81 sq mi)

Population (2011)
  - Total: 3,113
  - Density: 670/km^{2} (1,700/sq mi)
- Time zone: UTC+00:00 (WET)
  - Summer (DST): UTC+01:00 (WEST)

Cete is a Portuguese freguesia ("civil parish") of the municipality of Paredes. The population in 2011 was 3,113, in an area of 4.68 km².
