= Ângelo Varela =

Portuguese footballer

Personal information
- Full name: Ângelo Manuel Ferreira Varela
- Date of birth: 25 March 1980 (age 46)
- Place of birth: Paredes, Portugal
- Height: 1.75 m (5 ft 9 in)
- Position: Midfielder

Team information
- Current team: Sobrado

Youth career
- 1992–1994: SC Nun' Álvares
- 1994–1999: Porto

Senior career*
Years	Team	Apps	(Gls)
1999–2003	Ermesinde	140	(0)
2003	Lousada	15	(1)
2004	Pampilhosa	20	(1)
2004–2005	Estarreja	30	(0)
2005–2008	Ribeirão	80	(2)
2008–2010	Estoril	55	(0)
2010–2011	Fátima	18	(0)
2011–2012	Chaves	24	(0)
2012–2015	Ribeirão	79	(0)
2015–2017	Sobrado	62	(3)
2017–2018	Rebordosa	26	(2)
2018–2019	Aliados Lordelo	17	(0)
2019–	Sobrado	38	(3)
- * Club domestic league appearances and goals as of 1 October 2021

Ângelo Manuel Ferreira Varela (born 25 March 1980 in Paredes) is a Portuguese footballer who plays for Sobrado as a defensive midfielder.
