= Adalberto Ribeiro =

Portuguese footballer

Adalberto
Personal information
- Full name: Adalberto Manuel Silva Ribeiro
- Date of birth: 13 February 1969 (age 57)
- Place of birth: Paredes, Portugal
- Height: 1.81 m (5 ft 11 1/2 in)
- Position: Centre-back

Youth career
- 1982–1988: Paços Ferreira

Senior career*
Years	Team	Apps	(Gls)
1988–2005	Paços Ferreira	380	(19)

Managerial career
- 2012–2013: Amarante
- * Club domestic league appearances and goals

Adalberto Manuel Silva Ribeiro (born 13 February 1969), known simply as Adalberto, is a Portuguese former professional footballer who played as a central defender. After retirement, he managed Segunda Divisão side Amarante during the 2012–13 season.

== Club career ==
Adalberto was born in Paredes, Porto District. Youth years included, he represented F.C. Paços de Ferreira for 23 seasons, starting out in 1988 in the Liga de Honra and totalling 65 games in his first three years (four goals), which were spent at that level.

In the 1991–92 campaign, Adalberto made his Primeira Liga debut, contributing 33 matches as the northerners retained their league status. He scored his only goal in the competition on 20 October 1991, opening a 1–1 home draw against S.L. Benfica.

From 1994 to 2000, Adalberto played with the club in the second tier. Subsequently, he made a further 80 appearances in the top division, suffering relegation in 2004.

After helping Paços return to the top flight in 2005, the 36-year-old Adalberto retired from football. He was also team captain for several seasons.

== See also ==
- List of one-club men
