= Duas Igrejas =

Duas Igrejas may refer to the following parishes in Portugal:

- Duas Igrejas (Miranda do Douro), Miranda do Douro
- Duas Igrejas (Paredes)
- Duas Igrejas (Penafiel), Penafiel
- Duas Igrejas (Vila Verde), Vila Verde
- Duas Igrejas - Miranda railway station
