= Duas Igrejas (Paredes) =

- Civil parish
- Location in Portugal
- Coordinates: 41.24°N 8.37°W
- Country: Portugal
- Region: Norte
- Metropolitan area: Porto
- District: Porto
- Municipality: Paredes

Area
  - Total: 3.78 km^{2} (1.46 sq mi)

Population (2011)
  - Total: 3,879
  - Density: 1,000/km^{2} (2,700/sq mi)
- Time zone: UTC+00:00 (WET)
  - Summer (DST): UTC+01:00 (WEST)

Duas Igrejas is a Portuguese parish of the municipality of Paredes. The population in 2011 was 3,879, in an area of 3.78 km².
