= Gandra (Paredes) =

- Civil parish
- Location in Portugal
- Coordinates: 41.193°N 8.438°W
- Country: Portugal
- Region: Norte
- Metropolitan area: Porto
- District: Porto
- Municipality: Paredes

Area
  - Total: 11.76 km^{2} (4.54 sq mi)

Population (2011)
  - Total: 6,974
  - Density: 590/km^{2} (1,500/sq mi)
- Time zone: UTC+00:00 (WET)
  - Summer (DST): UTC+01:00 (WEST)

Gandra (Portuguese pronunciation: [ˈɡɐ̃dɾɐ]) is a city and parish in Portugal, part of the municipality of Paredes. The population in 2011 was 6,974, in an area of 11.76 km^{2}. It was promoted to a city in 2003.
