= Aguiar de Sousa =

- Civil parish
- Location in Portugal
- Coordinates: 41.129°N 8.449°W
- Country: Portugal
- Region: Norte
- Metropolitan area: Porto
- District: Porto
- Municipality: Paredes

Area
  - Total: 22.38 km^{2} (8.64 sq mi)

Population (2011)
  - Total: 1,631
  - Density: 73/km^{2} (190/sq mi)
- Time zone: UTC+00:00 (WET)
  - Summer (DST): UTC+01:00 (WEST)

Aguiar de Sousa is a Portuguese parish of the municipality of Paredes. The population in 2011 was 1,631, in an area of 22.38 km^{2}.

Aguiar de Sousa was formerly an extensive municipality that existed until the beginning of the 19th century. It was composed of 39 parishes, which are now part of the municipalities of Gondomar, Valongo, Lousada, Paredes and Paços de Ferreira. In 1801, it covered an area of about 260 km^{2} with 21,643 inhabitants.
