= Aliados F.C. Lordelo =

Portuguese football club

Aliados Lordelo
- Full name: Aliados Futebol Clube de Lordelo
- Founded: 1944; 82 years ago
- Ground: Estádio Cidade de Lordelo.Paredes
- Capacity: 5,250
- Chairman: (Portugal) Nuno Silva
- Manager: (Portugal) António Tonanha
- League: AF Porto Divisão de Elite - Pro-nacional
- 2021-22: AF Porto Divisão de Elite - Pro-nacional Série 4, 4th (finished in 4th place again in the next phase of the tournament)
Home colours	Away colours

Aliados Futebol Clube de Lordelo is a Portuguese football club from Lordelo, Paredes. Founded in 1944, it currently plays in Porto's District Leagues, holding home games at Estádio Cidade de Lordelo, with a capacity of 1,500.
