= List of Portuguese regions by Human Development Index =

Map of Portuguese regions by Human Development Index in 2019. Scale: > 0.900 0.875 – 0.850 0.850 – 0.825 < 0.825

This is a list of NUTS2 statistical regions of Portugal by Human Development Index as of 2023.

Rank	Province	HDI (2023)
Very high human development
1	Lisbon metropolitan area	0.917
–	Portugal (average)	0.890
2	Centro	0.881
3	Norte	0.878
4	Algarve	0.875
5	Alentejo	0.865
6	Madeira	0.844
7	Azores	0.829
