= Lixa =

Coordinates: 41°19′N 8°10′W

- City
- Interactive map of Lixa
- Country: Portugal

Area
  - Total: 12.58 km^{2} (4.86 sq mi)

Population
  - Total: 4,233

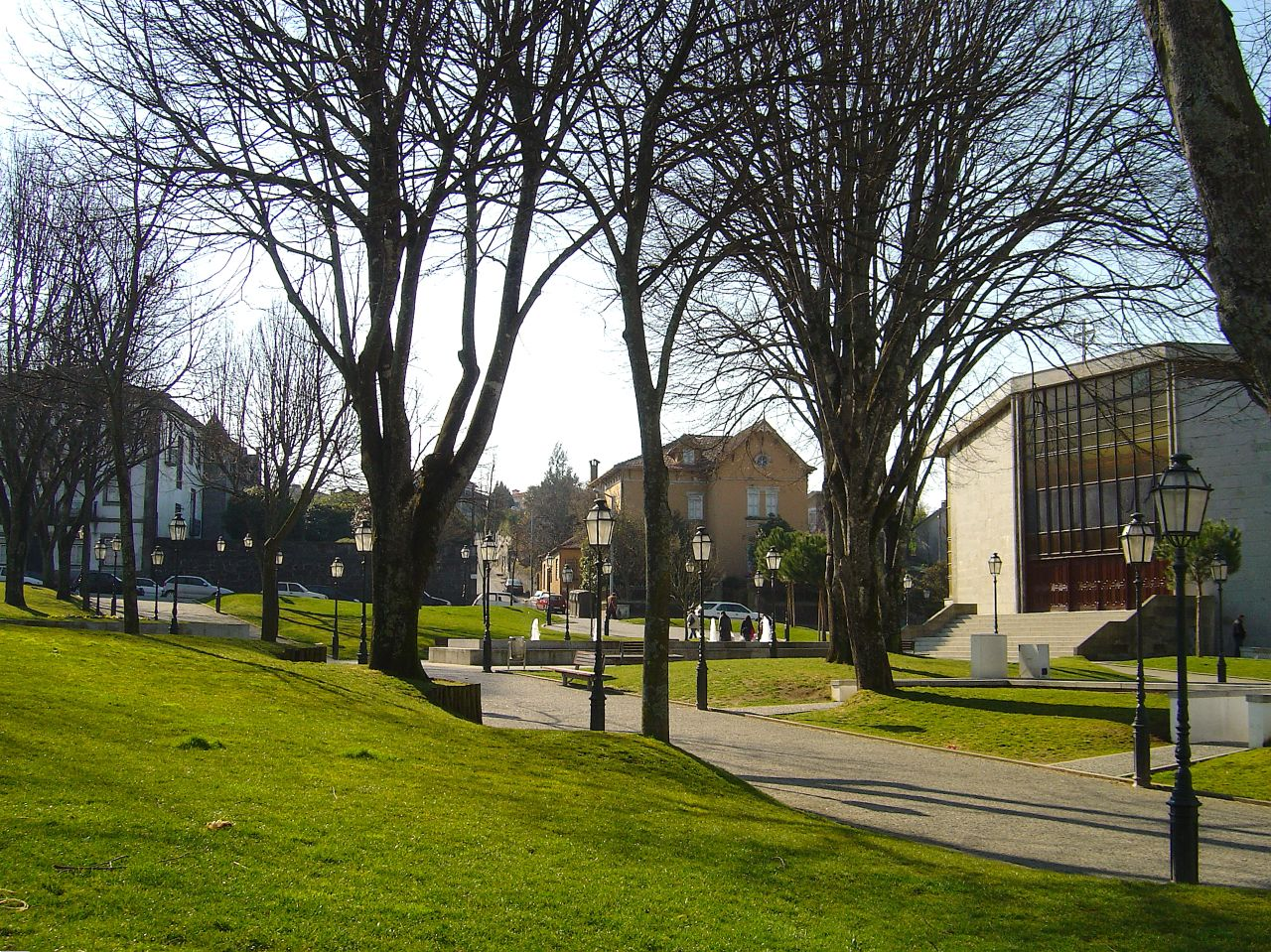
A street view in Lixa, Portugal

Lixa (Portuguese: [ˈliʃɐ]) is a Portuguese city in Felgueiras Municipality, with 4,233 inhabitants in 2001. It has four parishes, Vila Cova da Lixa, Santão, Borba de Godim and Macieira da Lixa, that adds 12,58 km^{2} in area.

== Parishes ==
- Vila Cova da Lixa
- Santão
- Borba de Godim
- Macieira da Lixa
