= Paredes, Portugal =

Paredes
- Municipality
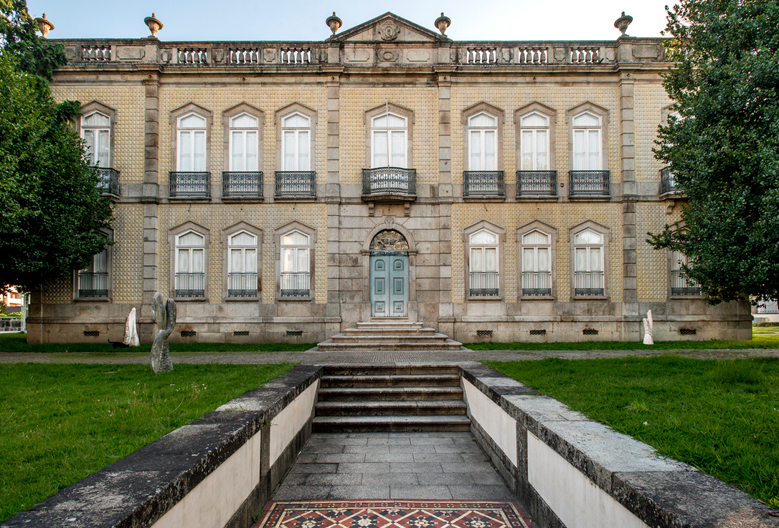
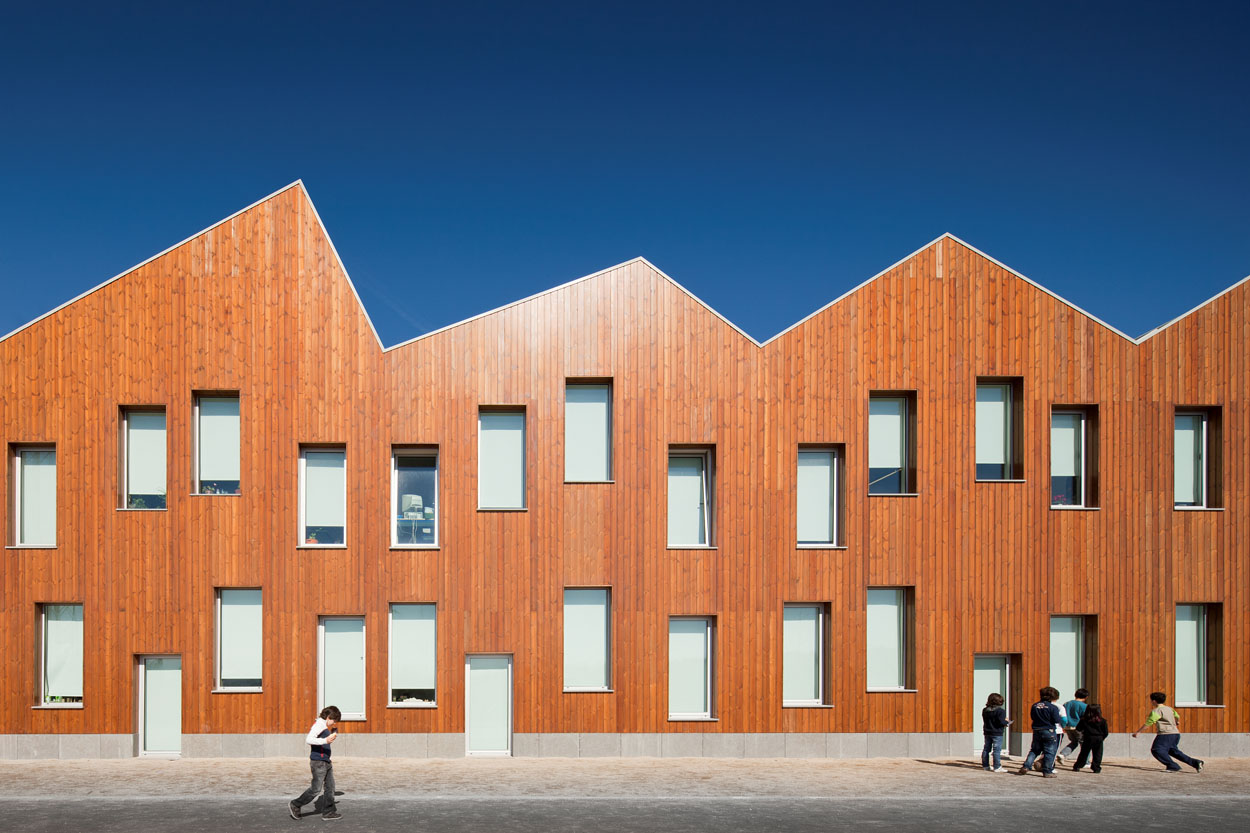
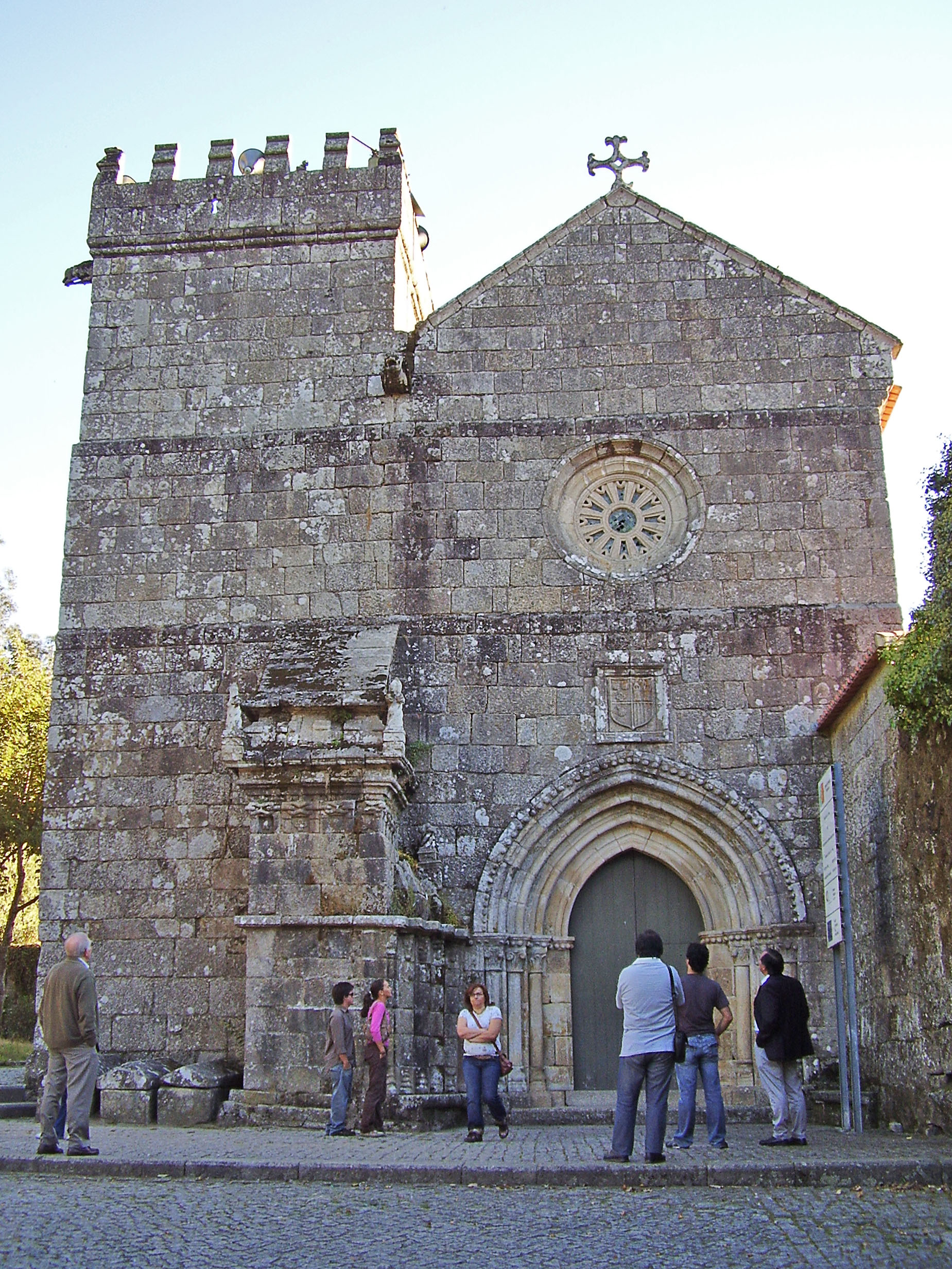
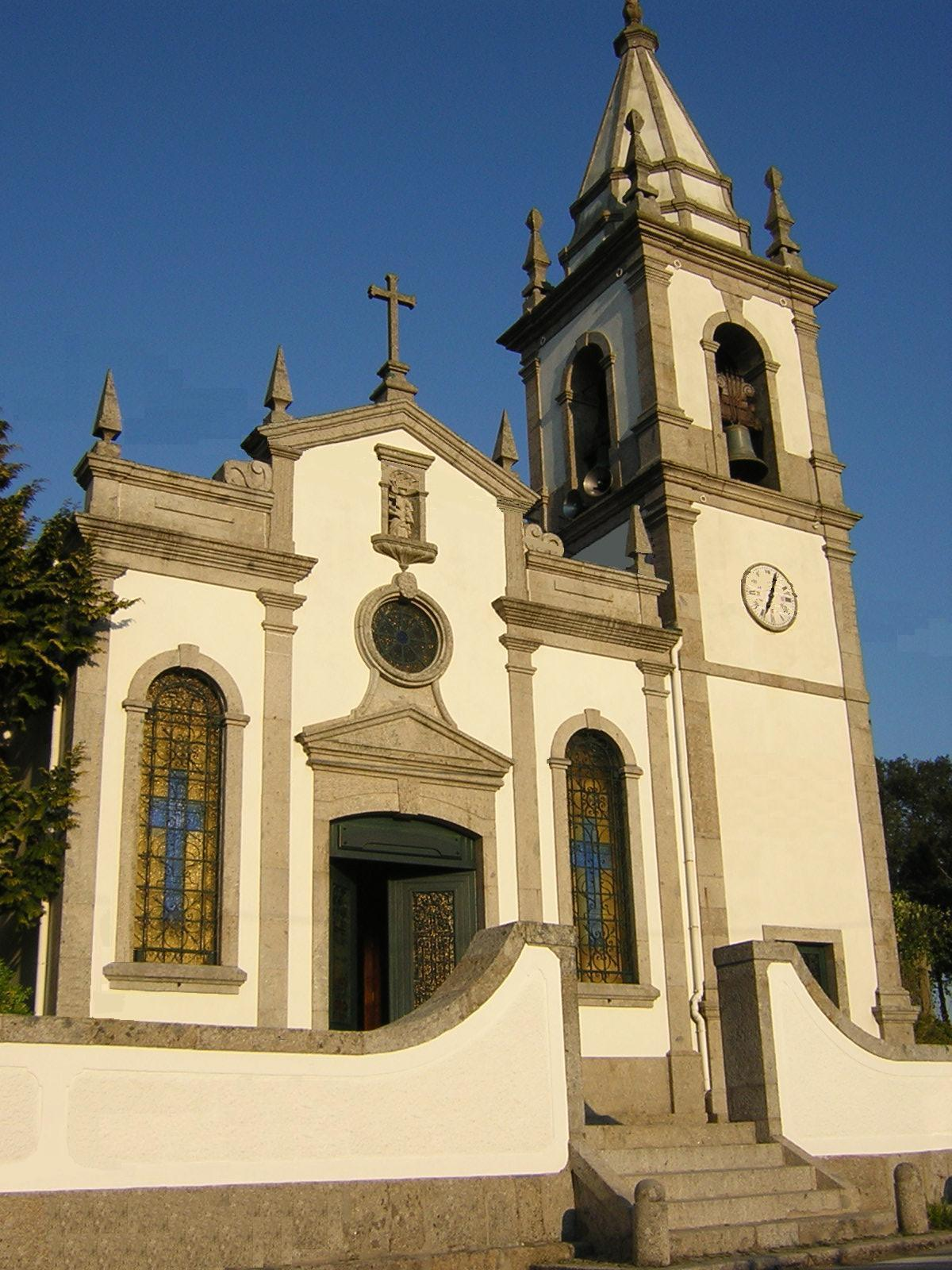
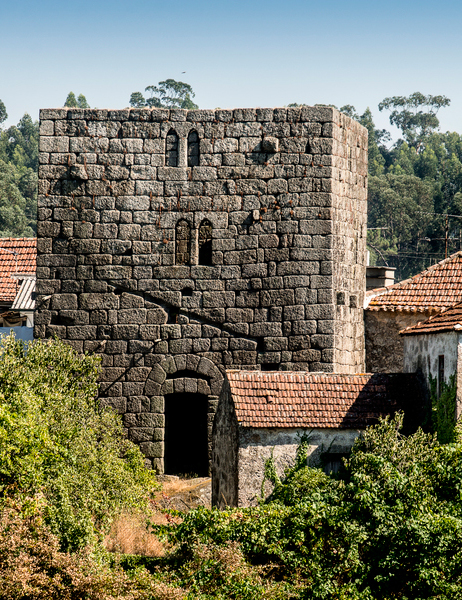
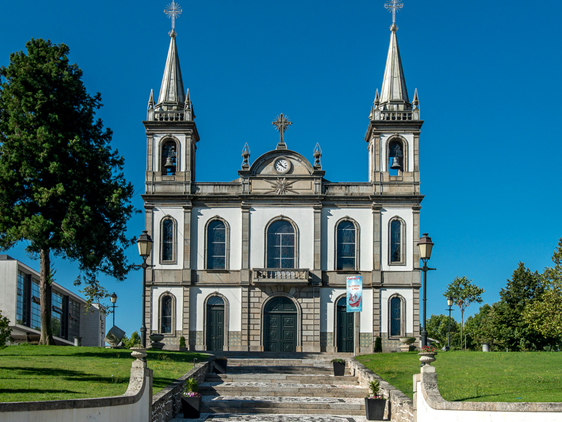
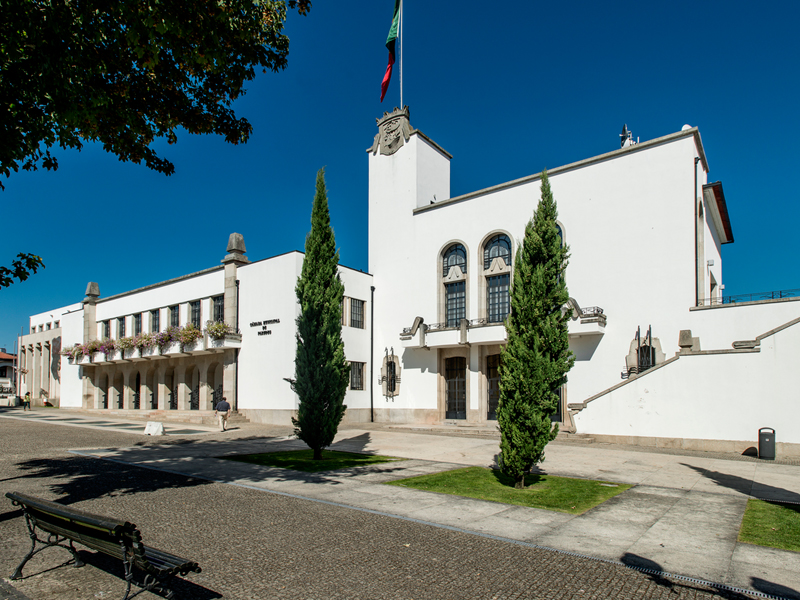

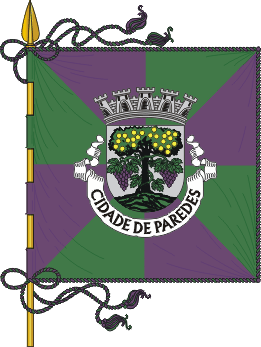
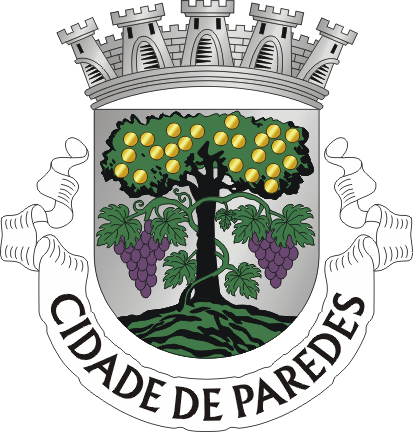
- Flag Coat of arms
- Interactive map of Paredes
- Coordinates: 41°12′23″N 8°20′00″W
- Country: Portugal
- Region: Norte
- Metropolitan area: Porto
- District: Porto
- Parishes: 18

Government
  - President: Alexandre Almeida (PS)

Area
  - Total: 156.76 km^{2} (60.53 sq mi)

Population (2021)
  - Total: 84,354
  - Density: 538.11/km^{2} (1,393.7/sq mi)
- Time zone: UTC+00:00 (WET)
  - Summer (DST): UTC+01:00 (WEST)
- Website: www.cm-paredes.pt

Paredes (European Portuguese pronunciation: [pɐˈɾeðɨʃ]) is a city and a municipality in Porto District, in northern Portugal. The population in 2021 was 84,354, in an area of 156.76 square kilometres (60.53 mi^{2}).

Currently, Paredes Municipality contains four cities: Paredes, Rebordosa, São Salvador de Lordelo and Gandra, being the Portuguese municipality with the most cities.

Paredes has a total of 18 parishes. The municipality is bordered on the north by the municipality of Paços de Ferreira, to the east by Lousada and Penafiel, to the southwest by Gondomar and to the west by Valongo. The municipality was created in 1836.

== History ==
=== Ancient and Medieval History ===
Archaeological evidence suggests that human presence in the area now constituting the municipality of Paredes dates back over 5,000 years. This includes remnants of ancient settlements and tools, indicative of early sedentary lifestyles. Notably, the Montanha do Muro in Vila Cova de Carros is home to the remnants of a pre-Roman castro, which likely served as the foundation for a fortification during the Reconquista. During the Roman period, beginning in the 2nd century BCE, the region gained importance due to its gold deposits in the parish of Sobreira at Castromil and Banjas. The Romans intensively exploited these resources, as evidenced by numerous mining shafts, galleries, and open cuts found in the area.

During the medieval period and until the end of the 13th century, a castle existed in the parish of Aguiar de Sousa, located in a difficult-to-access area surrounded by higher mountains. It was part of the defensive network of the region and it received significant attention from the Asturian kings in the 9th and 10th centuries. During the Reconquista, it was captured in 995 by the Muslim general Almanzor, who led incursions towards Santiago de Compostela. The castle played a key role in the territorial organization of the 11th century, leading a Territory (Terra) and later the Jurisdiction (Julgado) of Aguiar de Sousa. The jurisdiction was an independent political, judicial, and administrative entity formed in the 13th century, comprising 48 parishes.

Several noble families settled in the region, leading to the establishment of four monasteries, Cete, Lordelo, Vandoma, and Vilela, and the corresponding Coutos (land grants to the clergy) and three Honras (lands owned by nobles), Sobrosa, Baltar, and Louredo.

=== Early Modern and Contemporary History ===
By the 16th century, economic activities in the jurisdiction had shifted northward, closer to the Sousa River. As a result, administrative functions transitioned from Aguiar de Sousa to the village of Paredes. The village had a courthouse and a prison and it was located along the road between Porto and Vila Real within the parish of Castelões de Cepeda. Although the jurisdictional name changed to reflect the village of Paredes, the parish of Castelões de Cepeda remained the ecclesiastical and administrative hub. Ecclesiastically, Castelões de Cepeda was an abbacy under the shared patronage of the Diocese of Porto and the Monastery of Paço de Sousa.

In 1833, Baltar, Louredo, and Sobrosa were briefly raised to municipalities under Mouzinho da Silveira's reforms. However, in 1837, Passos Manuel incorporated these areas into the newly created municipality of Paredes, which initially included 23 parishes. The parish of Recarei was only created in 1855.

Paredes was officially elevated to the status of vila (town) on February 7, 1844, through a royal charter granted by Queen Maria II. Between 1864 and 1871, the mayor José Guilherme Pacheco would promote advancements in infrastructure, transportation, communication, and education, in line with the policies of Fontes Pereira de Melo.

During the 19th and early 20th centuries, Paredes saw significant development in the furniture-making industry, influenced by technological innovations and investment from wealthy emigrants returning from Brazil. Factories such as "A Boa Nova" benefited from direct investments, furniture orders, and inspiration derived from Brazilian designs brought back by these individuals.

Since the end of the 20th century, several administrative changes took place in the municipality. Paredes was elevated to city status on June 20, 1991, while Gandra, Lordelo, and Rebordosa were elevated in 2003. Also in 2003, several parishes, including Baltar, Cete, Recarei, Sobreira, and Vilela, elevated to the status of vila (town), while Sabrosa was elevated to vila in 2011. In 2013, a national administrative restructuring reduced the number of parishes from 24 to 18 through a series of amalgamations. Notably, the parishes of Besteiros, Bitarães, Castelões de Cepeda, Gondalães, Madalena, Mouriz, and Vila Cova de Carros were combined into the newly named parish of Paredes.

Population of Paredes (1849–2021)
Year	Pop.	±%
1849	17,286	—
1864	17,652	+2.1%
1878	18,042	+2.2%
1890	19,757	+9.5%
1900	20,911	+5.8%
1911	23,256	+11.2%
1920	24,853	+6.9%
1930	26,304	+5.8%
1940	31,529	+19.9%
1950	36,274	+15.0%
1960	43,388	+19.6%
1970	53,140	+22.5%
1981	67,693	+27.4%
1991	72,999	+7.8%
2001	83,376	+14.2%
2011	86,854	+4.2%
2021	84,354	−2.9%
Source: INE

== Parishes ==
Administratively, the municipality is divided into 18 civil parishes (freguesias):

- Aguiar de Sousa
- Astromil
- Baltar
- Beire
- Cete
- Cristelo
- Duas Igrejas
- Gandra
- Lordelo
- Louredo
- Parada de Todeia
- Paredes
- Rebordosa
- Recarei
- Sobreira
- Sobrosa
- Vandoma
- Vilela

== Culture ==
Paredes has a local newspaper called O Progresso de Paredes first published on January 3, 1931. Originally a weekly publication with four pages, over time, it transitioned to a biweekly format with 24 pages per edition, available in print and online. Novum Canal, a Portuguese television channel is headquartered in Paredes.

== Notable people ==
=== Sport ===
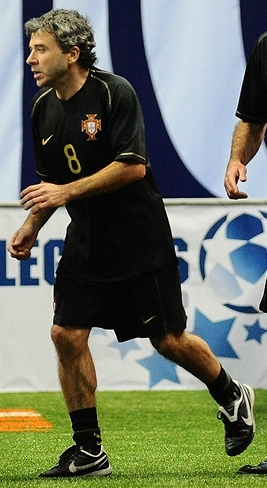
Rui Barros

- António Araújo (1923–2001) a former footballer with 151 club caps and 9 for Portugal
- Hélder Barbosa (born 1987) a footballer with over 330 club caps and 1 for Portugal
- Rui Barros (born 1965) a former footballer with 409 club caps and 36 for Portugal
- Maria Helena Cunha (born 1943) a gymnast, competed in 5 events at the 1960 Summer Olympics
- Fábio Pacheco (born 1988) a footballer with over 300 club caps
- Jaime Pacheco (born 1958) a former footballer with 305 club caps and 25 for Portugal
- Adalberto Ribeiro (born 1969), known as Adalberto, a retired footballer with 380 club caps
- Pedro Ribeiro (born 1983) a former footballer with 387 club caps
- Vasco Rocha (born 1989) a footballer with over 350 club caps
- Mário Sérgio (born 1981) a former footballer with over 450 club caps
- José Manuel Ribeiro da Silva (1935–1958) a cyclist who won the Volta a Portugal in 1955 and 1957
- Luís Silva (born 1972) a fencer who competed at the 1992 Summer Olympics
- Ângelo Varela (born 1980) a former footballer with over 480 club caps
