= Lordelo (Paredes) =

Coordinates: 41.2336°N 8.4111°W

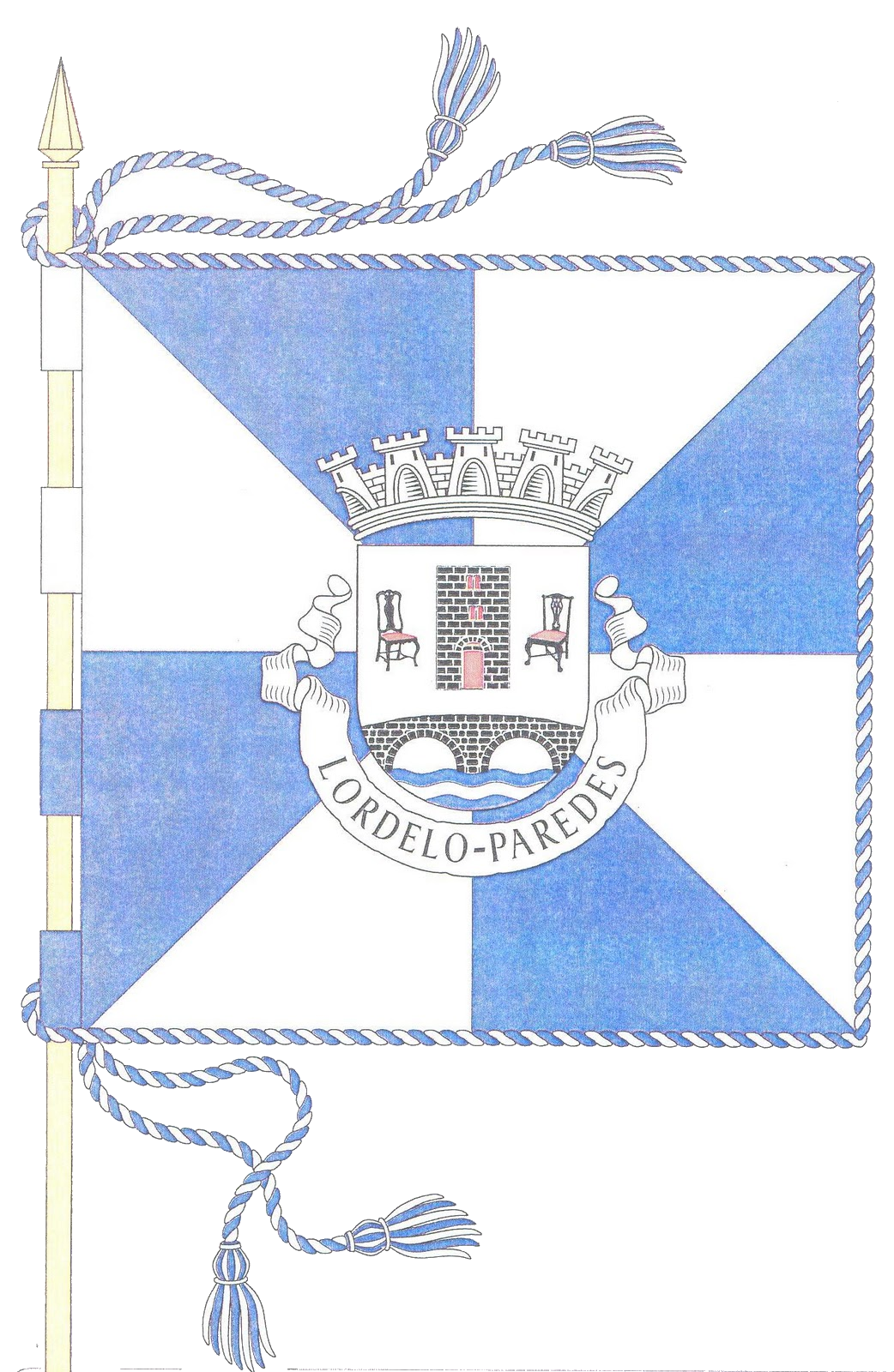

Lordelo, often known as São Salvador de Lordelo, is a city located in Paredes Municipality, Porto District, Portugal. The former town was elevated to the status of a city in 2003; although it was proposed at that time that the name should be changed to São Salvador de Lordelo the law as enacted retained the name of Lordelo.
