= Porto District =

District of Portugal

Coordinates: 41°09′00″N 8°36′36″W

Porto
- District
- Flag Coat of arms

- Location of Porto within continental Portugal
- Country: Portugal
- Region: Northern Portugal
- Historical province: Entre Douro e Minho
- Number of municipalities: 18
- Number of parishes: 275
- Capital: Porto

Area
  - Total: 2,395 km^{2} (925 sq mi)

Population
  - Total: 1,817,172
  - Density: 758.7/km^{2} (1,965/sq mi)
- ISO 3166 code: PT-13
- No. of parliamentary representatives: 39

Porto (Note: [diʃˈtɾitu du ˈpoɾtu]) is a district located on the north-west coast of Portugal. The district capital is the city of Porto, the second largest city in the country. It is bordered by the Aveiro and Viseu districts to the south, Braga district to the north and Vila Real district to the east.

Its area is 2,395 km^{2} (925 sq mi) and its population is 1,817,172. In 2017, the main legal foreign populations were from Brazil (9,442), China (2,475), Ukraine (2,160), Italy (1,273), Spain (1,189), Angola (1,118), and Cape Verde (1,040). These numbers exclude those who obtained Portuguese citizenship, which is regular among recent Portuguese Brazilians or Portuguese-Africans.

== Municipalities ==
The district comprises 18 municipalities:

- Amarante [city]
- Baião [town]
- Felgueiras [city]
- Gondomar [city]
- Lousada [town]
- Maia [city]
- Marco de Canaveses [city]
- Matosinhos [city]
- Paços de Ferreira [city]
- Paredes [city]
- Penafiel [city]
- Porto [main city]
- Póvoa de Varzim [city]
- Santo Tirso [city]
- Trofa [city]
- Valongo [city]
- Vila do Conde [city]
- Vila Nova de Gaia [city], the most populous municipality and the only municipality in Porto District located south of the Douro River.

All of the above Municipalities are Cities, except Baião and Lousada. Some municipalities include one or more cities;the municipality of Paredes has the most cities within its municipality: Paredes, Gandra, Rebordosa and São Salvador de Lordelo. Other cities in Porto district: Rio Tinto and Valbom (in Gondomar municipality), Ermesinde (in Valongo municipality), São Mamede de Infesta (in Matosinhos municipality), Freamunde (in Paços de Ferreira municipality) and Lixa (in Felgueiras municipality).

== Main Airport ==
Porto Airport /Oporto Int.(OPO) Sá Carneiro, mostly located in Pedras Rubras, Moreira, Maia, Grande Porto.

== Main Harbour ==
Leixões in Matosinhos, Porto area.

== Summary of votes and seats won 1976–2022 ==
Summary of election results from Porto district, 1976–2022
Parties	%	S	%	S	%	S	%	S	%	S	%	S	%	S	%	S	%	S	%	S	%	S	%	S	%	S	%	S	%	S	%	S
Parties	1976		1979		1980		1983		1985		1987		1991		1995		1999		2002		2005		2009		2011		2015		2019		2022	
PS	40.7	18	34.8	14	34.3	14	43.0	18	23.6	10	26.7	11	32.9	13	46.7	18	48.0	19	41.2	17	48.5	20	41.8	18	32.0	14	32.7	14	36.7	17	42.5	19
PSD	27.0	11	In AD				26.2	10	29.3	12	50.9	22	51.3	21	36.4	14	32.7	13	40.0	16	27.8	12	29.2	12	39.2	17	In PàF		31.2	15	32.3	14
CDS-PP	15.7	6	In AD				12.5	5	9.8	4	4.0	1	4.1	1	7.8	3	7.5	3	8.4	3	6.9	2	9.3	4	10.0	4	In PàF		3.3	1	1.5	
PCP/APU/CDU	8.4	3	14.5	6	11.9	5	13.6	5	12.1	5	9.4	4	6.4	2	6.0	2	6.2	2	4.6	1	5.4	2	5.7	2	6.2	2	6.8	3	4.8	2	3.3	1
AD			44.5	18	46.6	19																										
PRD									20.5	8	4.0	1																				
BE																	2.3		2.7	1	6.7	2	9.2	3	5.1	2	11.1	5	10.1	4	4.8	2
PàF																											39.6	17				
PAN																													3.5	1	1.7	
IL																													1.5		5.1	2
CHEGA																													0.6		4.4	2
Total seats	38								39				37						38				39						40			
Source: Comissão Nacional de Eleições
