= NUTS statistical regions of Portugal =

Statistical regions of Portugal

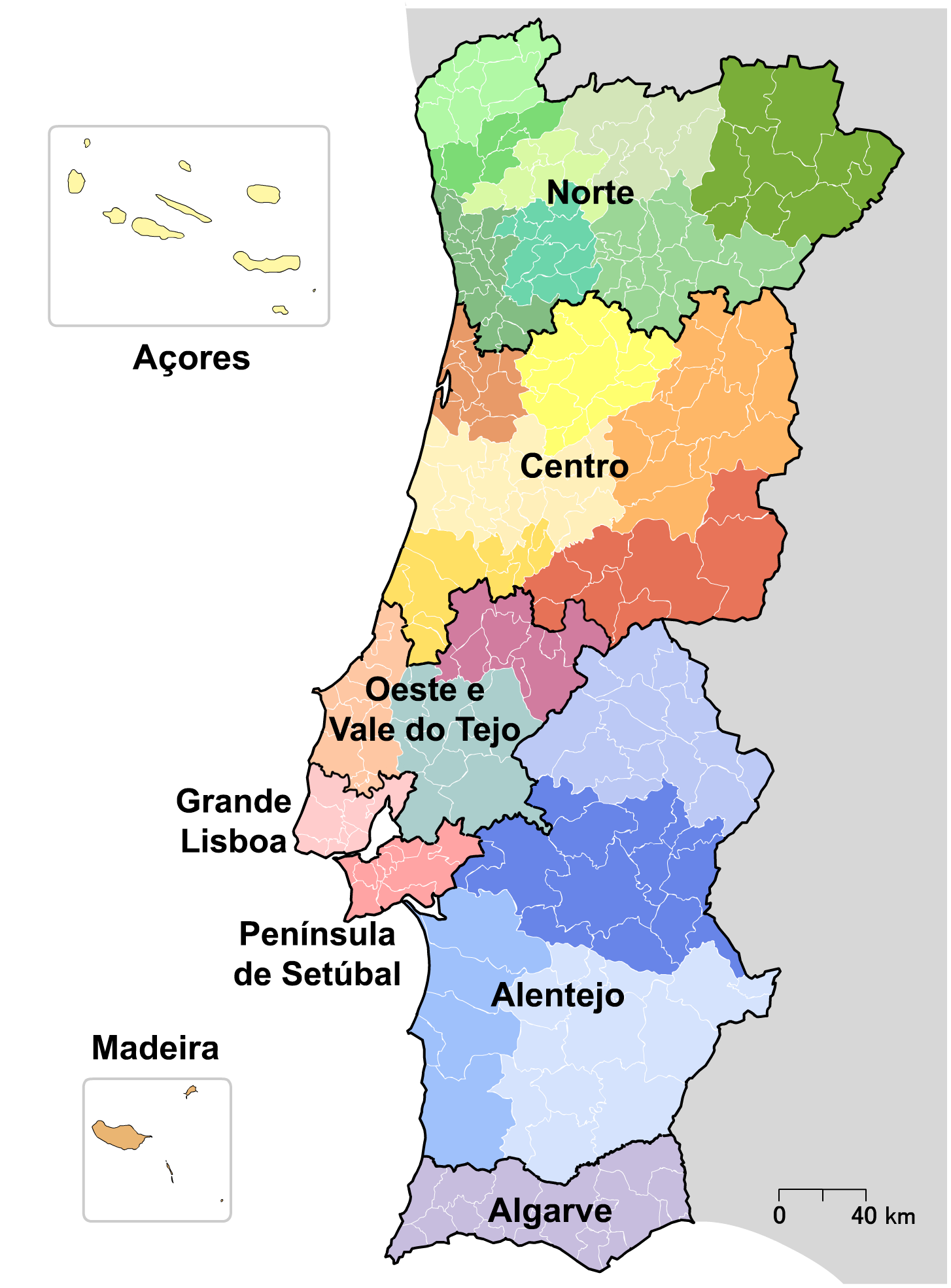
Territorial map corresponding to the NUTS I and NUTS II designations

The Nomenclature of Territorial Units for Statistics (NUTS) is developed by Eurostat, and employed in both Portugal and the entire European Union for statistical purposes. The NUTS branch extends from NUTS1, NUTS2 and NUTS3 regions, with the complementary LAU (Local Administrative Units) sub-categorization being used to differentiate the local areas, of trans-national importance.

Developed by Eurostat and implemented in 1998, the Nomenclature of Territorial Units for Statistics (NUTS) regions, which comprises three levels of the Portuguese territory, are instrumental in European Union's Structural Fund delivery mechanisms. The standard was developed by the European Union and extensively used by national governments, Eurostat and other EU bodies for statistical and policy matters. Until 4 November 2002, the Sistema Estatístico Nacional (SEN) used a NUTS codification system that was distinct from the Eurostat system. With the enactment of Decree Law 244/2002 (5 November 2002), published in the Diário da República, this system was abandoned in order to harmonize the national system with that of Eurostat.

== Subdivisions ==
The NUTS system subdivides the nation into three levels: NUTS I, NUTS II and NUTS III. In some European partners, as is the case with Portugal, a complementary hierarchy, respectively LAU I and LAU II (posteriorly referred to as NUTS IV and NUTS V) is employed. The LAU, or Local Administrative Units, in the Portuguese context pertains to the 308 municipalities (LAU I) and 3092 civil parishes (LAU II) respectively. In the broadest sense, the NUTS hierarchy, while they may follow some of the borders (municipal or parish) diverge in their delineation.

Subdivision	No.	Description
NUTS 1: National	3	Continental Portugal, the Azores and Madeira
NUTS 2: Regions	9	Regional Coordination Commissions and Autonomous Regions
NUTS 3: Subregion	26	Administrative, Statistical and Autonomous Regions

== Changes NUTS 2-3 (1986—2024) ==
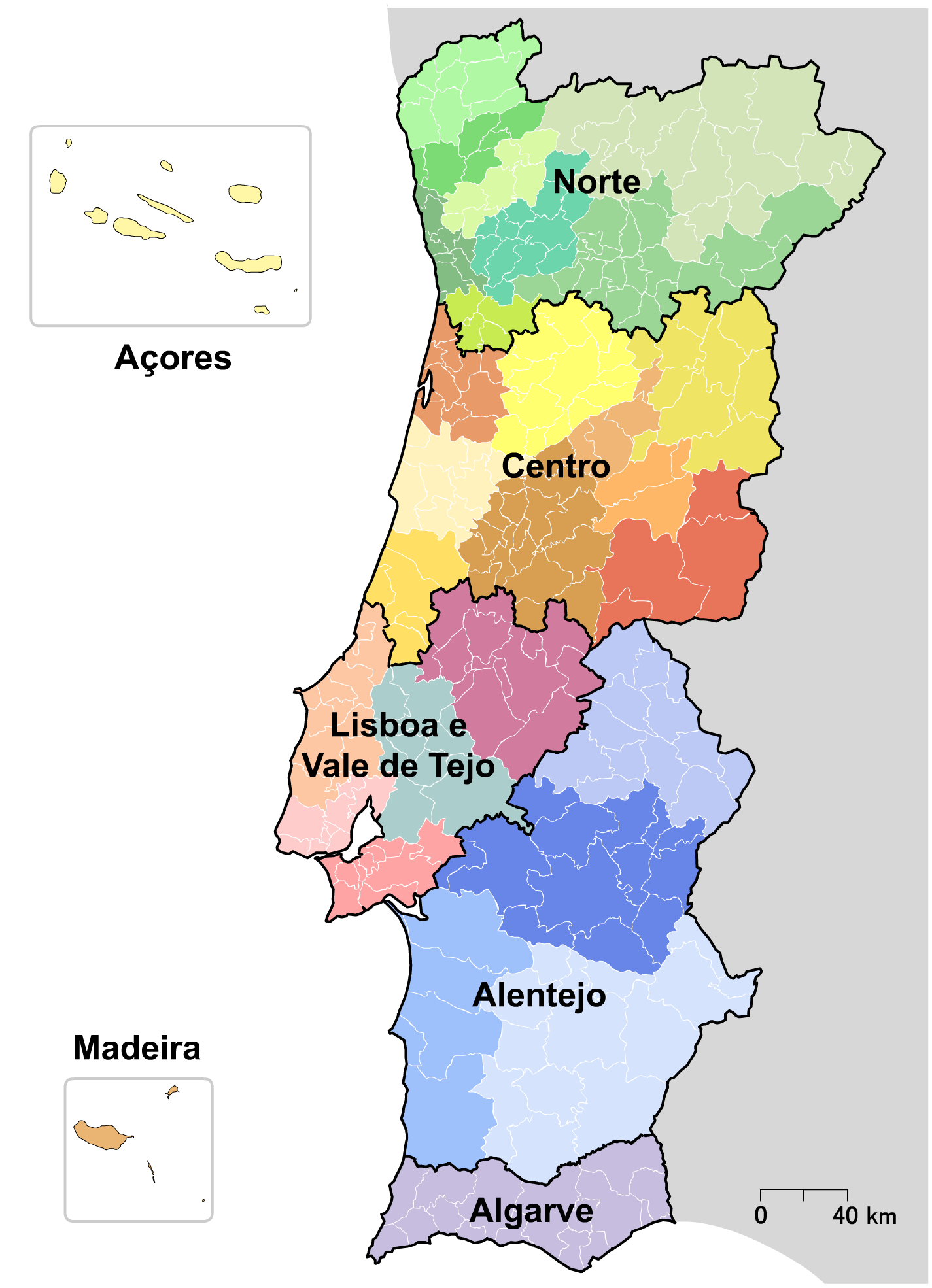
1986

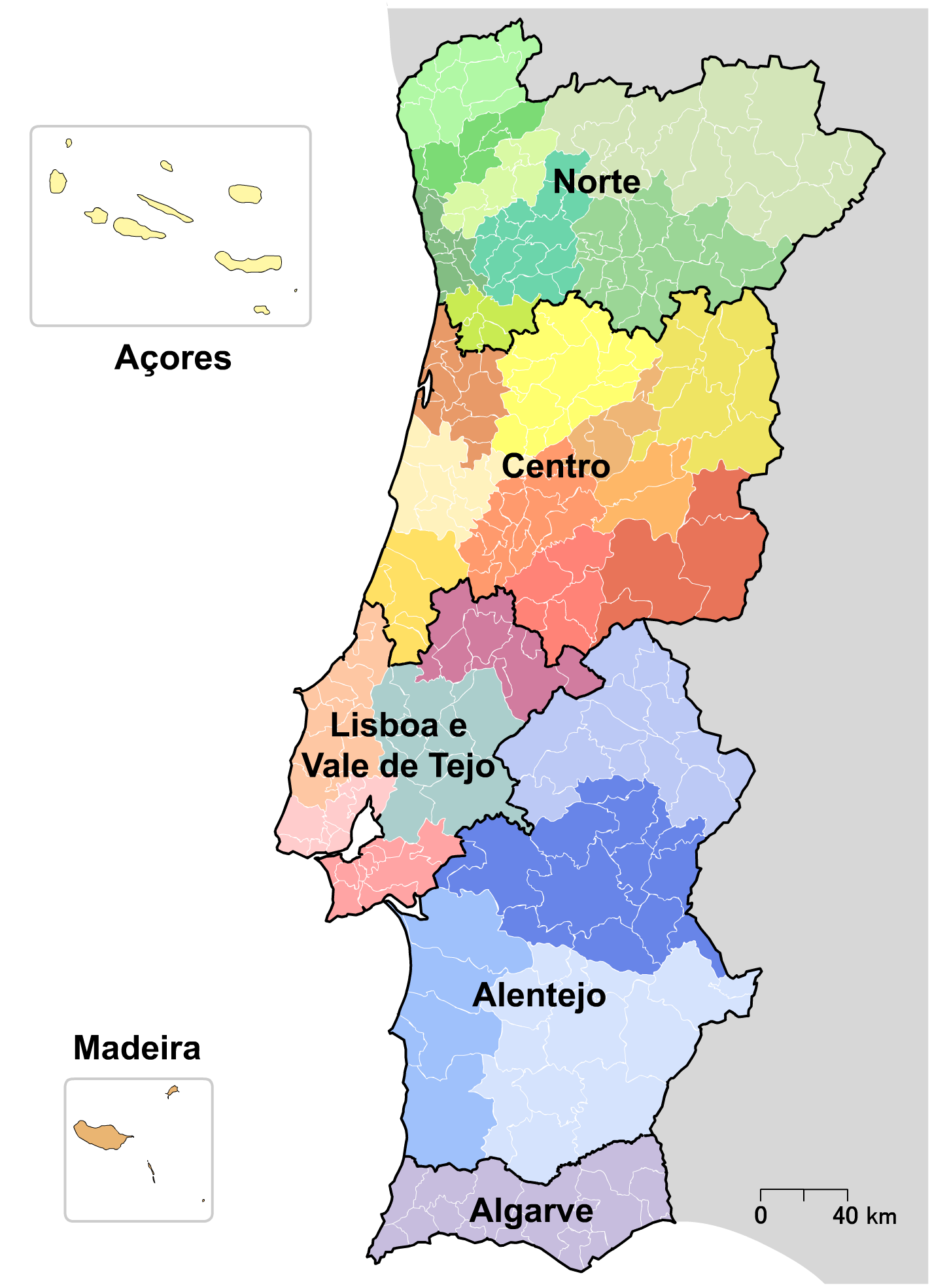
1989

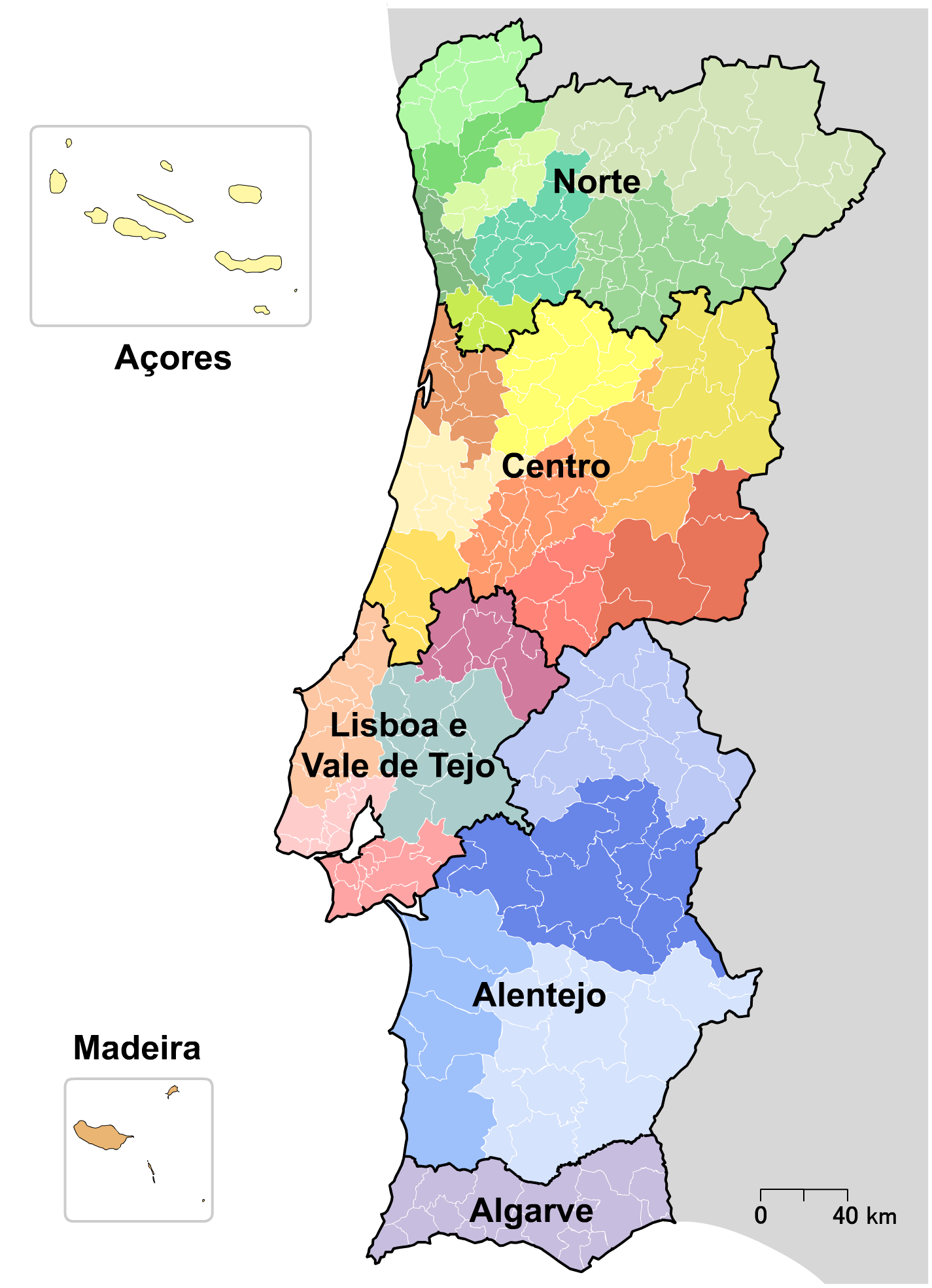
1999

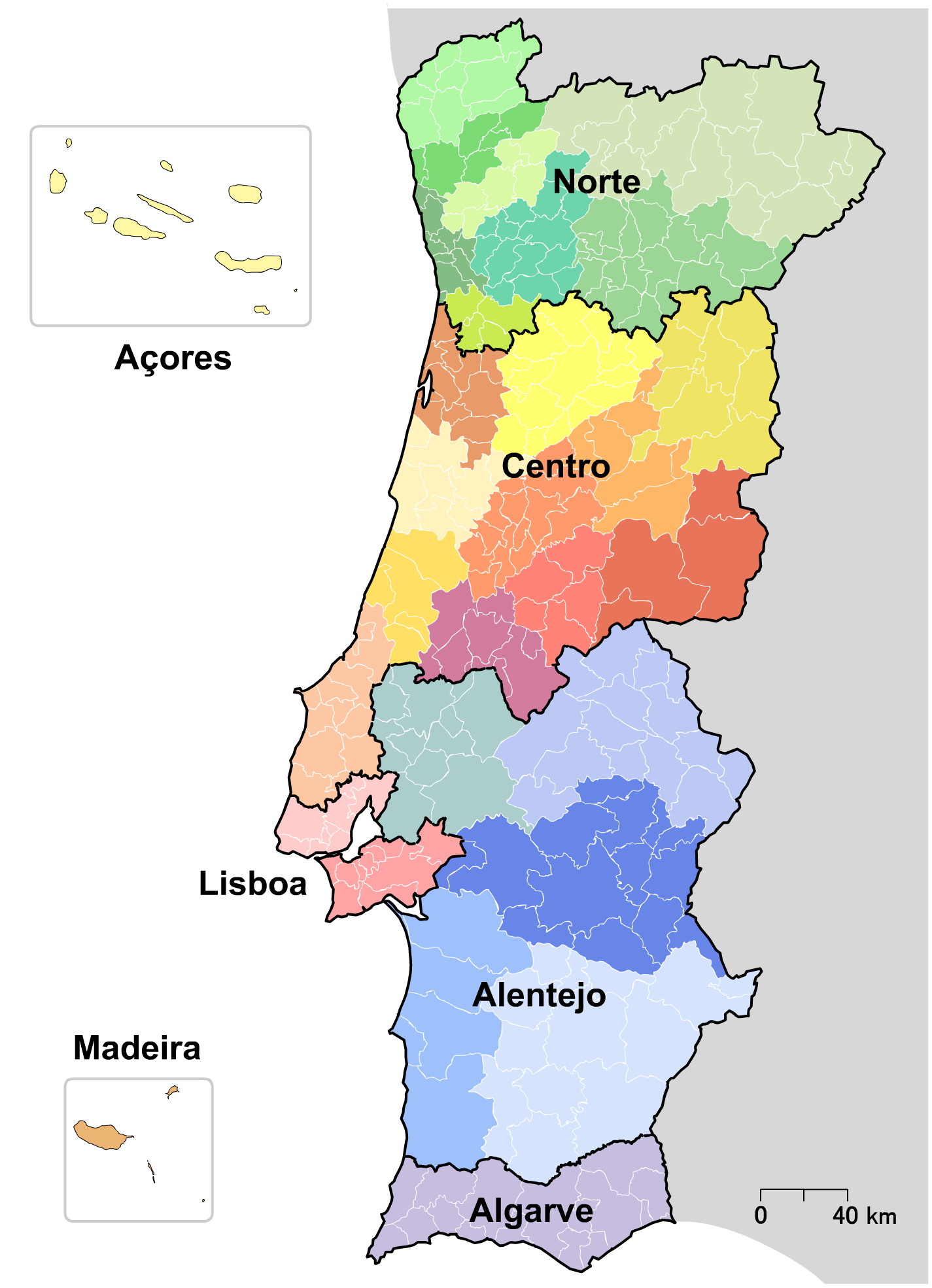
2002

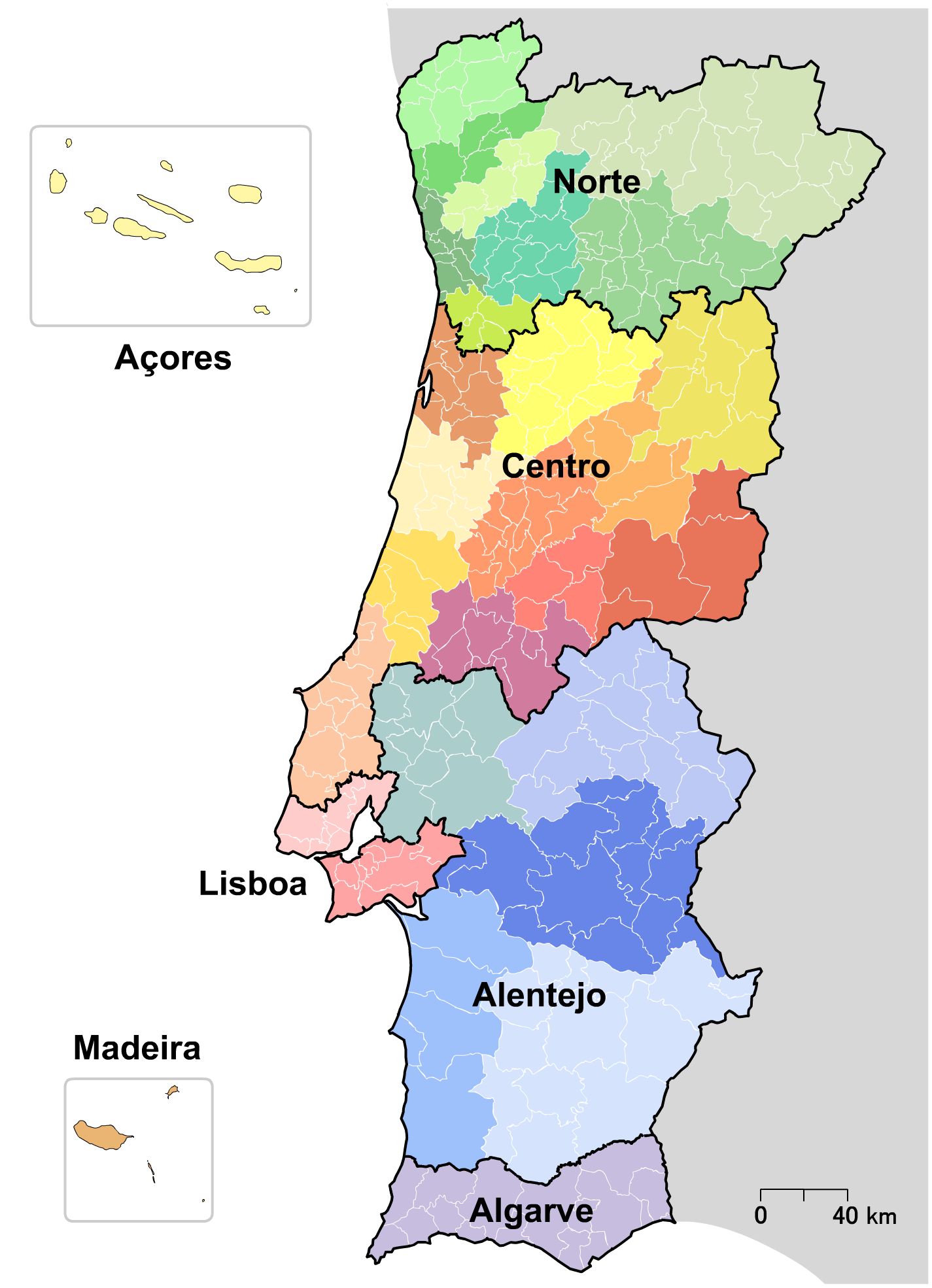
2010

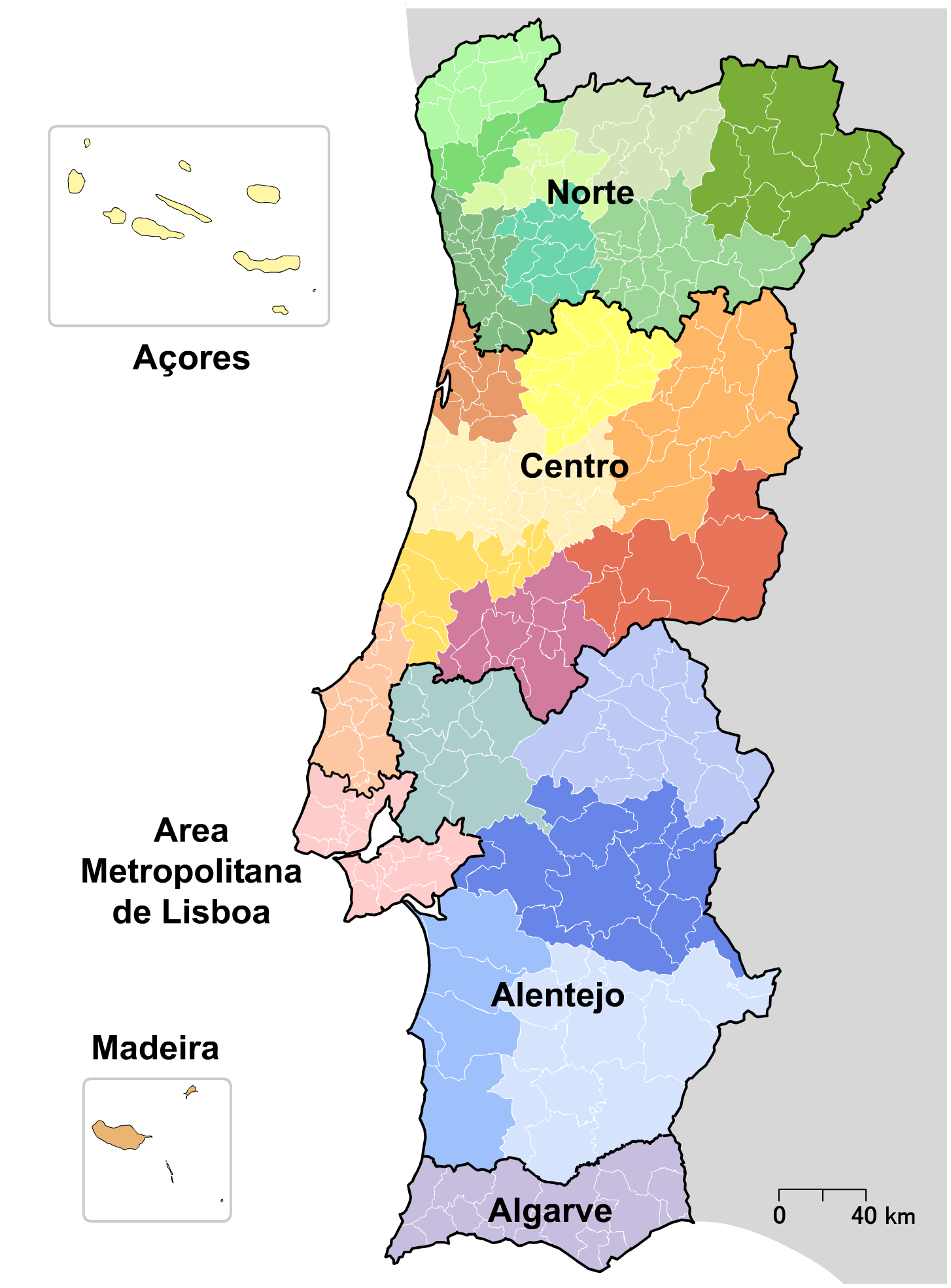
2013

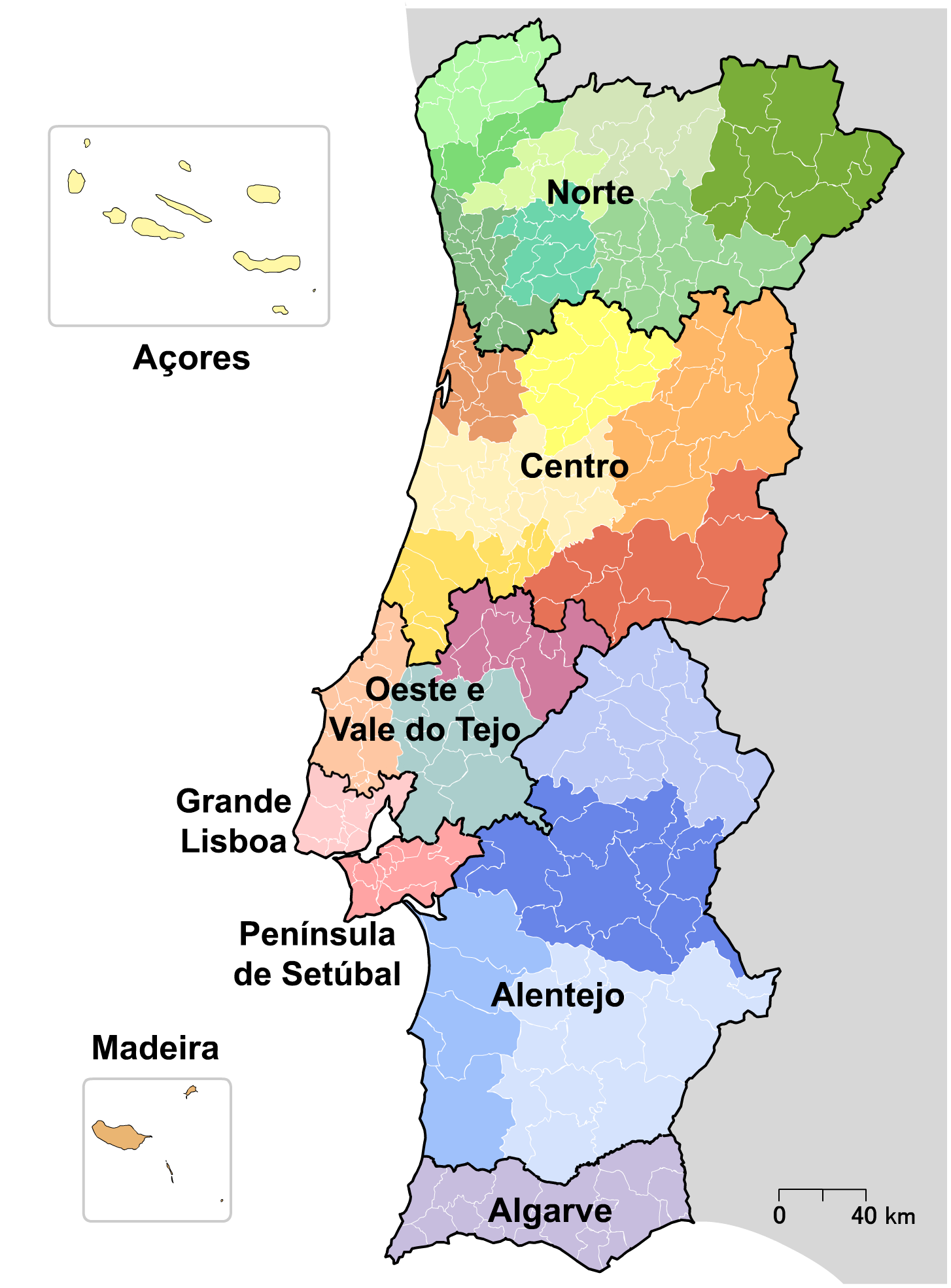
2024

=== NUTS I ===
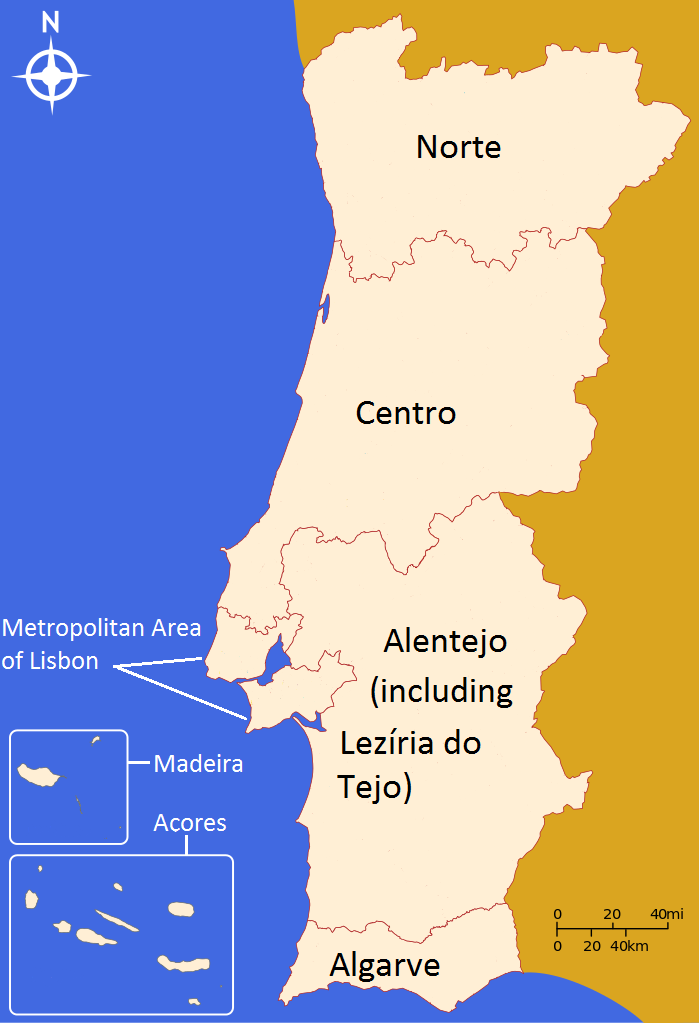
Territorial map corresponding to the NUTS I and (outdaded as of 2024) NUTS II designations

The first and broadest subdivision of Portugal is between continental Portugal and the two autonomous regions of the Azores and Madeira.

=== NUTS II ===
Although the districts are still the most socially relevant subdivision, their function is being phased in favour of locally oriented regional units, and regions are growing in importance. Since the creation of Oeste e Vale do Tejo in 2024, Portugal is divided into seven regions, in continental Portugal, plus the two autonomous regions that are their own NUTS II regions.

=== NUTS III ===
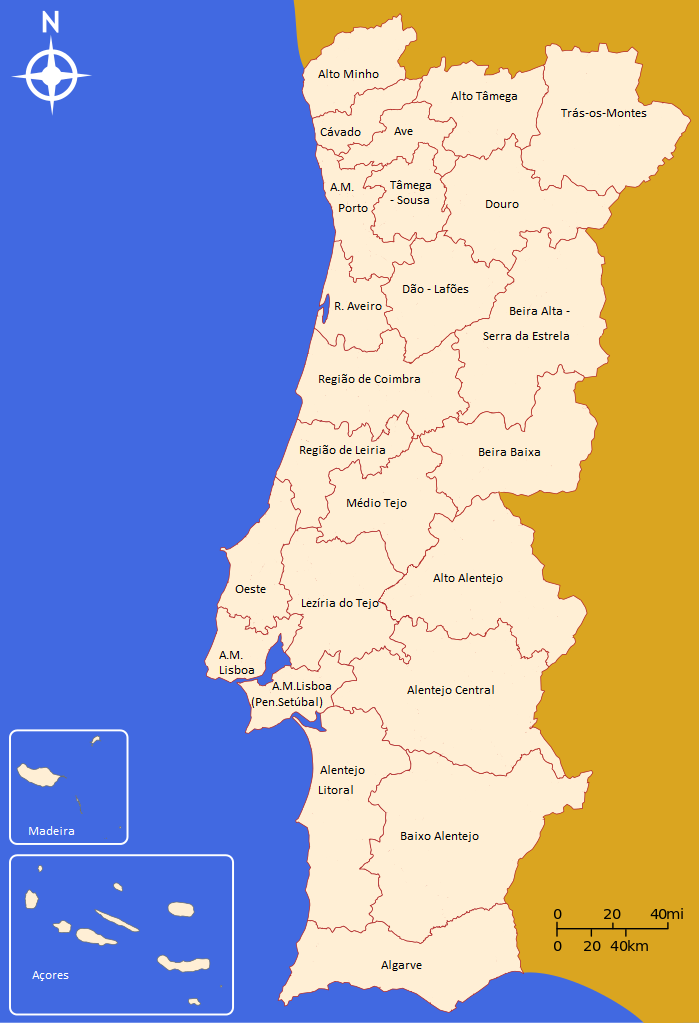
Territorial map corresponding to the 24 statistical subregions of mainland Portugal (NUTS III) and the 2 autonomous regions of Madeira and the Azores

The nine regions of Portugal are likewise subdivided into 26 subregions (Portuguese: subregiões) that, from 2015, represent the 2 metropolitan areas, the 22 intermunicipal communities and the 2 autonomous regions. Therefore, since the 2013 revision (enforced in 2015), the Portuguese subregions have a statutory and administrative relevance.

The two autonomous regions (Portuguese: regiões autónomas) in the Atlantic, correspond to their own NUTS I, II and III categories.

=== NUTS Codes ===
The regions, subregions and their NUTS codes are:

Code	NUTS 1	Code	NUTS 2	Code	NUTS 3
PT1	Portugal Continental	PT11	Norte	PT111	Alto Minho
PT1	Portugal Continental	PT11	Norte	PT112	Cávado
PT1	Portugal Continental	PT11	Norte	PT119	Ave
PT1	Portugal Continental	PT11	Norte	PT11A	Área Metropolitana do Porto
PT1	Portugal Continental	PT11	Norte	PT11B	Alto Tâmega
PT1	Portugal Continental	PT11	Norte	PT11C	Tâmega e Sousa
PT1	Portugal Continental	PT11	Norte	PT11D	Douro
PT1	Portugal Continental	PT11	Norte	PT11E	Terras de Trás-os-Montes
PT1	Portugal Continental	PT15	Algarve	PT150	Algarve
PT1	Portugal Continental	PT19	Centro	PT191	Região de Aveiro
PT1	Portugal Continental	PT19	Centro	PT192	Região de Coimbra
PT1	Portugal Continental	PT19	Centro	PT193	Região de Leiria
PT1	Portugal Continental	PT19	Centro	PT194	Viseu Dão-Lafões
PT1	Portugal Continental	PT19	Centro	PT195	Beira Baixa
PT1	Portugal Continental	PT19	Centro	PT196	Beiras e Serra da Estrela
PT1	Portugal Continental	PT1A	Grande Lisboa	PT1A0	Grande Lisboa
PT1	Portugal Continental	PT1B	Península de Setúbal	PT1B0	Península de Setúbal
PT1	Portugal Continental	PT1C	Alentejo	PT1C1	Alentejo Litoral
PT1	Portugal Continental	PT1C	Alentejo	PT1C2	Baixo Alentejo
PT1	Portugal Continental	PT1C	Alentejo	PT1C3	Alto Alentejo
PT1	Portugal Continental	PT1C	Alentejo	PT1C4	Alentejo Central
PT1	Portugal Continental	PT1D	Oeste e Vale do Tejo	PT1D1	Oeste
PT1	Portugal Continental	PT1D	Oeste e Vale do Tejo	PT1D2	Médio Tejo
PT1	Portugal Continental	PT1D	Oeste e Vale do Tejo	PT1D3	Lezíria do Tejo
PT2	Região Autónoma dos Açores	PT20	Região Autónoma dos Açores	PT200	Região Autónoma dos Açores
PT3	Região Autónoma da Madeira	PT30	Região Autónoma da Madeira	PT300	Região Autónoma da Madeira

== LAUs ==
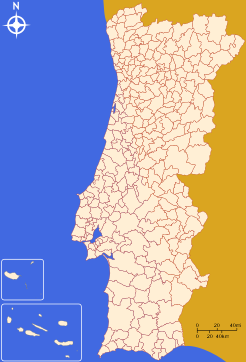
The LAU1 designated municipalities of Portugal

Municipalities and civil parishes were at NUTS IV and V levels, but these nomenclature units have been abolished and substituted by LAUs: the municipality is classified as LAU 1, while the civil parish is LAU level 2. Below the NUTS levels, the two LAU (Local Administrative Unit) levels are:

Sudvision	No.	Description
LAU 1	308	Municipalities
LAU 2	3259	Civil Parishes

The LAU codes of Portugal can be downloaded at: Eurostat

== See also ==
- Administrative divisions of Portugal
- ISO 3166-2 codes of Portugal
- FIPS region codes of Portugal
- List of Portuguese regions by Human Development Index
- Subdivisions of Portugal

== Sources ==
- Hierarchical list of the Nomenclature of territorial units for statistics - NUTS and the Statistical regions of Europe
- Overview map of EU Countries - NUTS level 1
  - PORTUGAL - NUTS level 2
  - PORTUGAL - NUTS level 3
- Correspondence between the NUTS levels and the national administrative units
- List of current NUTS codes
  - Download current NUTS codes (ODS format)
- Regions of Portugal, Statoids.com
- Municipalities of Portugal, Statoids.com
- Regiões de Portugal, LOCAL.PT
