= Porto metropolitan area =

Porto Metropolitan Area Área Metropolitana do Porto
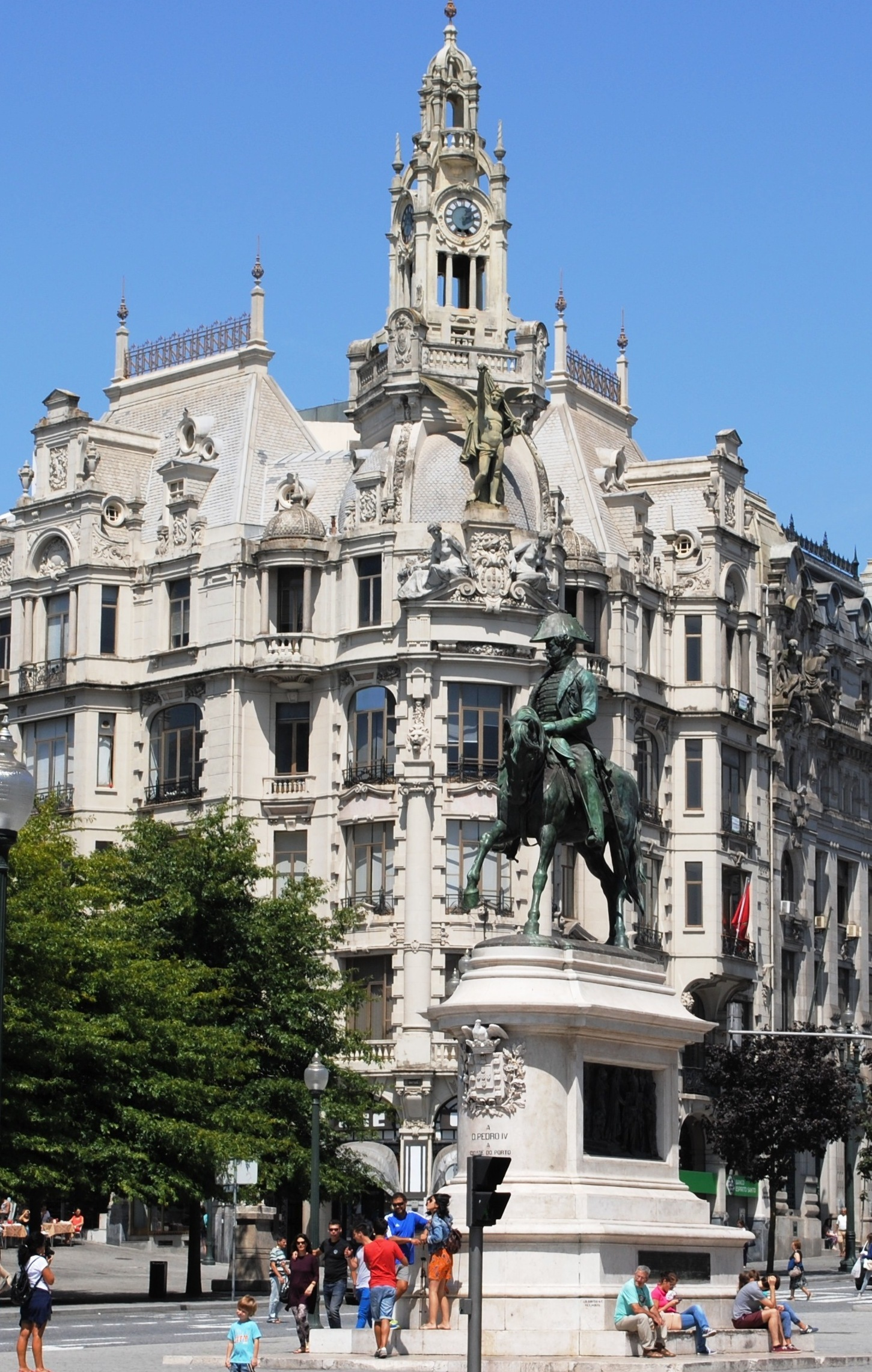
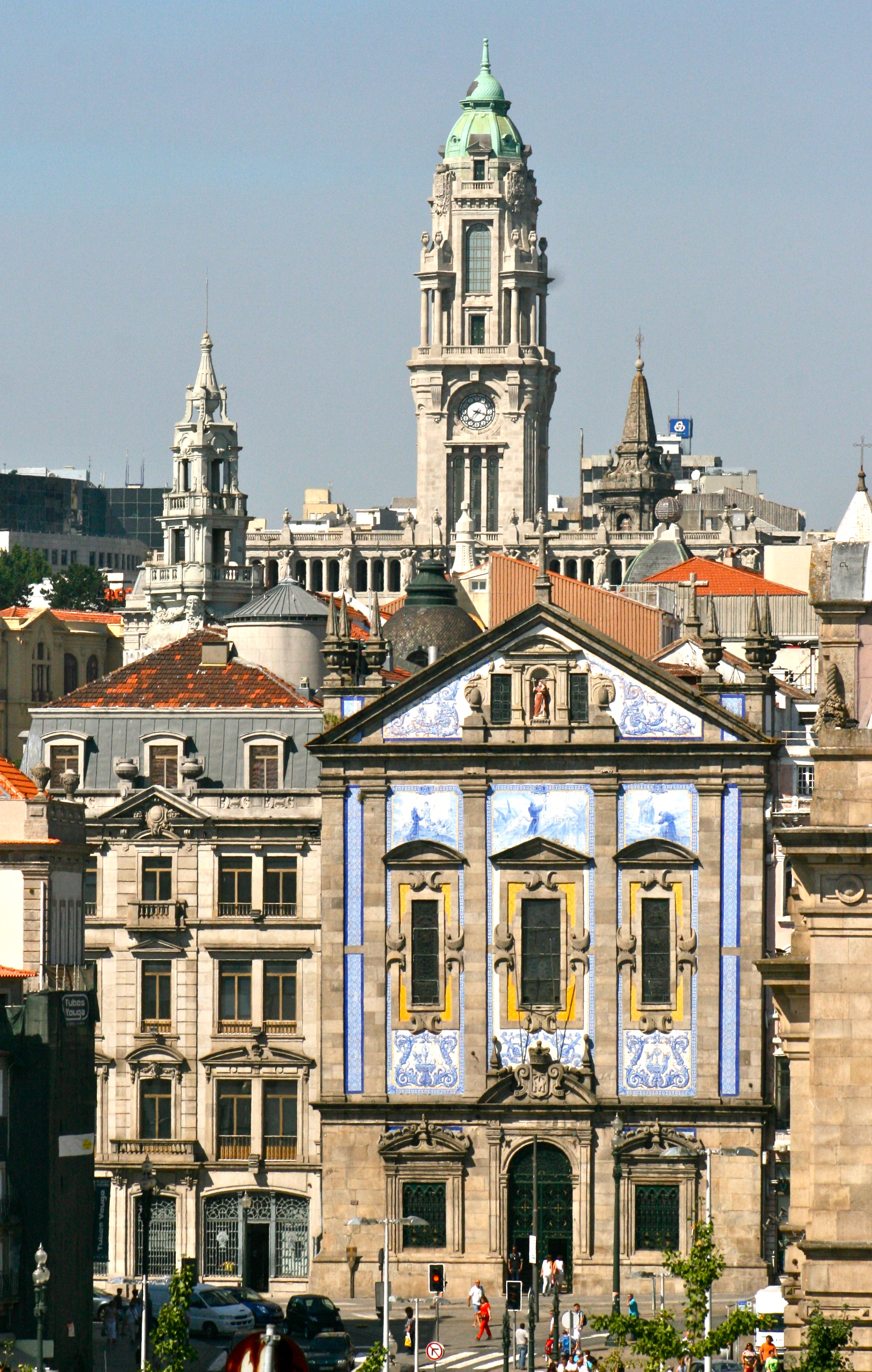
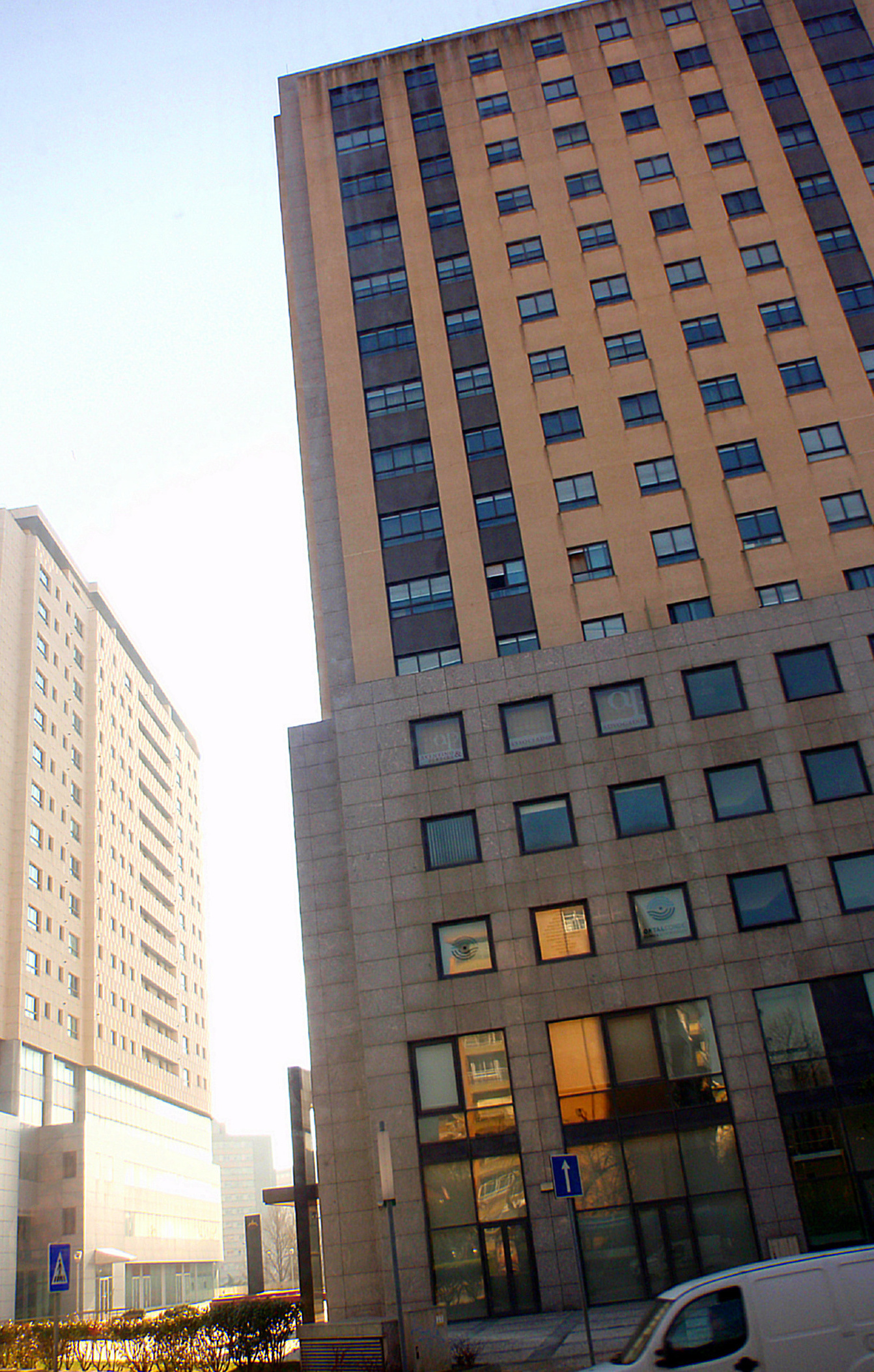
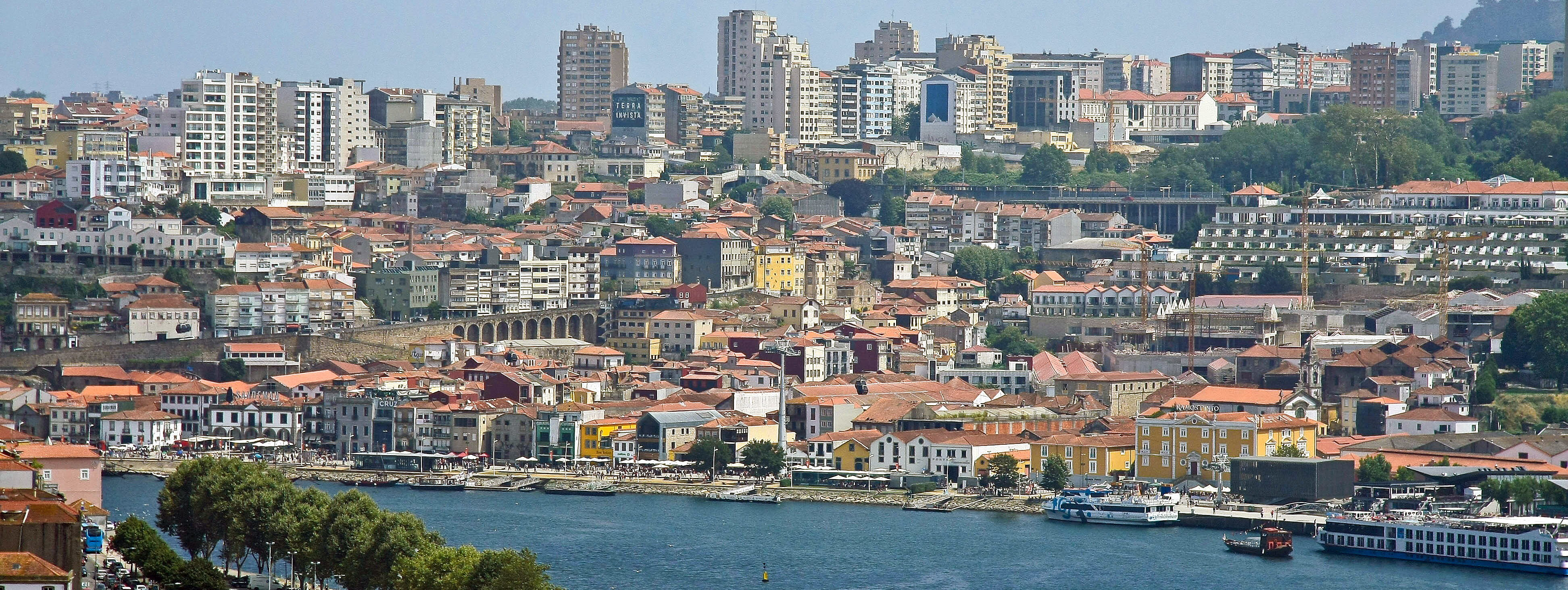
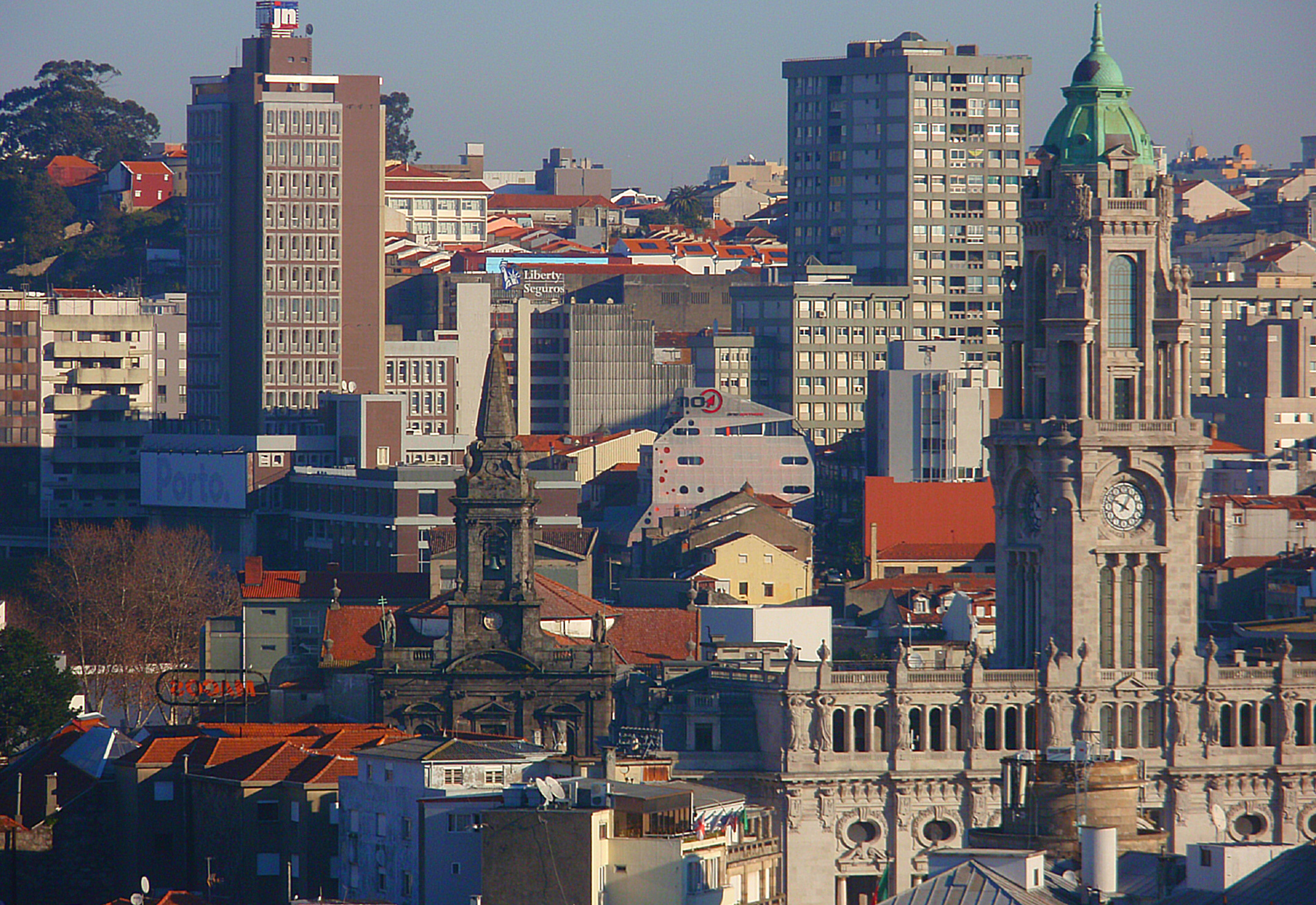
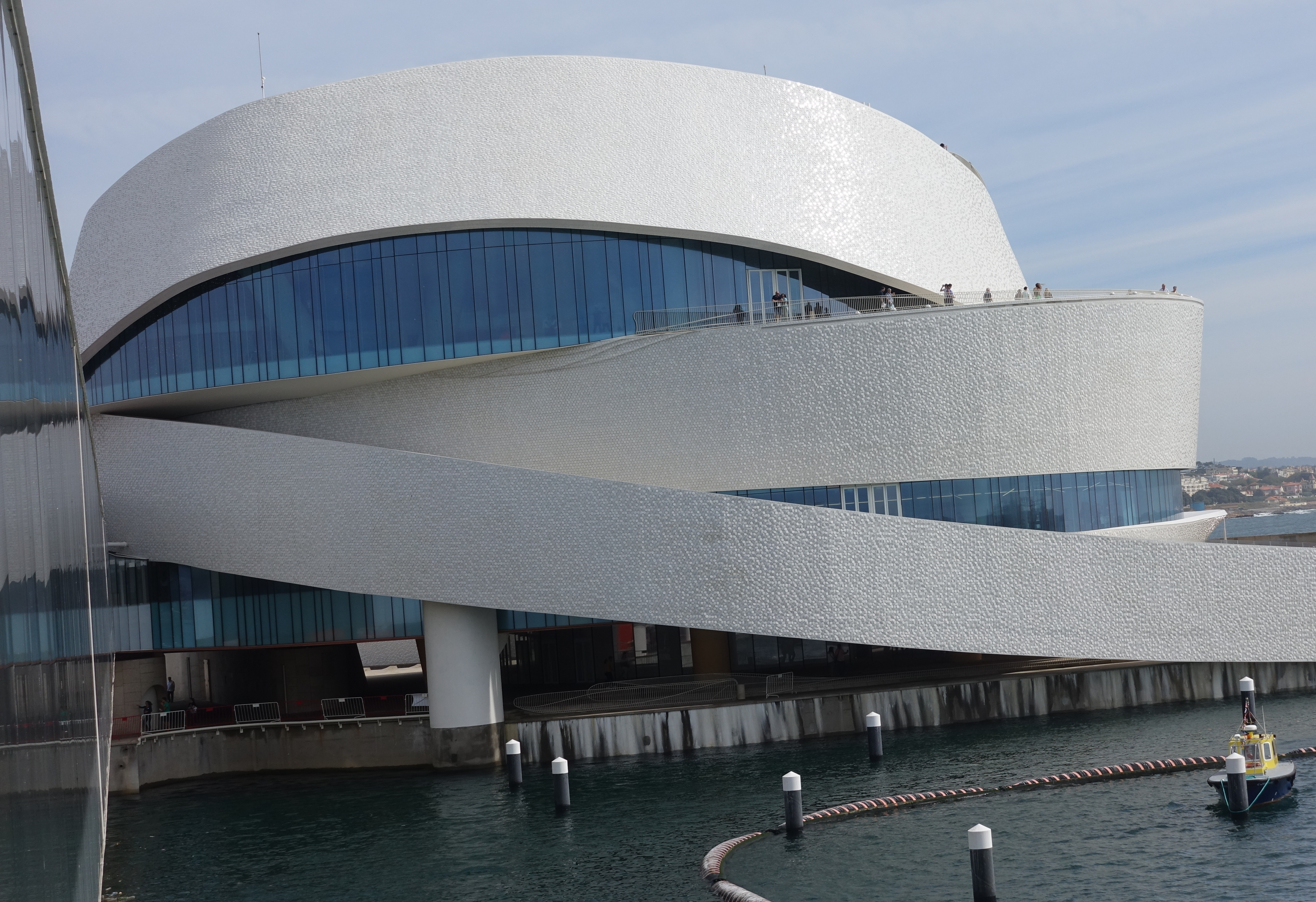
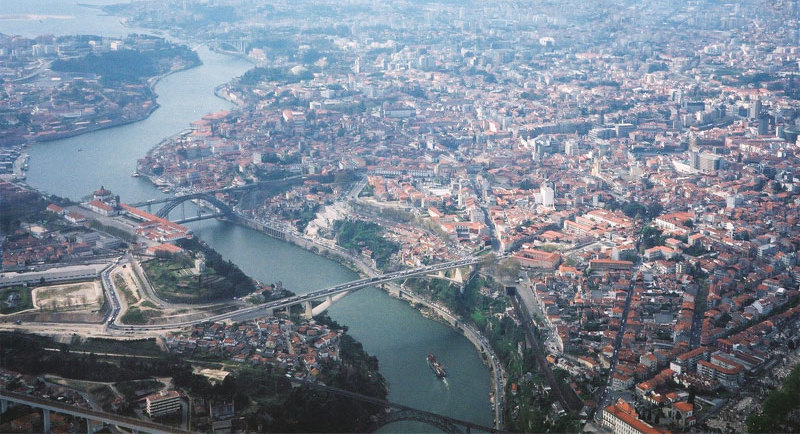
- Clockwise: Liberdade Square; Congregados Church; high-rises on Avenida da Boavista; view of Vila Nova de Gaia; Port of Leixões in Matosinhos; aerial view of the Porto Metropolitan Area; view of central Porto.

- Interactive map of Porto Metropolitan Area
- Core city: Porto
- Municipalities: Arouca, Espinho, Gondomar, Maia, Matosinhos, Oliveira de Azeméis, Paredes, Porto, Póvoa de Varzim, Santa Maria da Feira, Santo Tirso, São João da Madeira, Trofa, Vale de Cambra, Valongo, Vila Nova de Gaia and Vila do Conde.

Government
  - President: Pedro Duarte (PSD)

Area
  - Total: 2,040.31 km^{2} (787.77 sq mi)

Population (2025)
  - Total: 1,861,727
  - Density: 912.473/km^{2} (2,363.29/sq mi)

GDP (nominal)
  - Total: €46.967 billion (2024)
  - Per capita: €25,942 (2024)
- HDI (2017): 0.835 very high · 2nd
- Website: Official website

The Porto Metropolitan Area (Portuguese: Área Metropolitana do Porto ; abbreviated as AMP) is a metropolitan area in northern Portugal centered on the City of Porto, Portugal's second largest city. The metropolitan area, covering 17 municipalities, is the second largest urban area in the country and one of the largest in the European Union, with a population in 2025 of 1,861,727 in an area of 2,040.31 km².

The Porto Metropolitan Area is a major economic engine in Portugal, with a very high HDI (Human Development Index) and a GDP above the European average. Porto has been Portugal's largest manufacturing region since the Industrial Revolution and is home to many of the country's largest corporations.

It is chaired by Pedro Duarte (PSD).

== History ==
The original Metropolitan Area of Porto was constituted by nine municipalities: Porto (the capital), Espinho, Gondomar, Maia, Matosinhos, Póvoa de Varzim, Vila Nova de Gaia, Valongo, and Vila do Conde. The process of enlargement:

- Arouca (joined 08/01/2005)
- Oliveira de Azeméis (joined 01/09/2008)
- Paredes (joined 12/09/2013)
- São João da Madeira (joined 08/01/2005)
- Santa Maria da Feira (joined 08/01/2005)
- Santo Tirso (joined 08/01/2005)
- Trofa (joined (08/01/2005)
- Vale de Cambra (joined (01/09/2008)

== Government ==
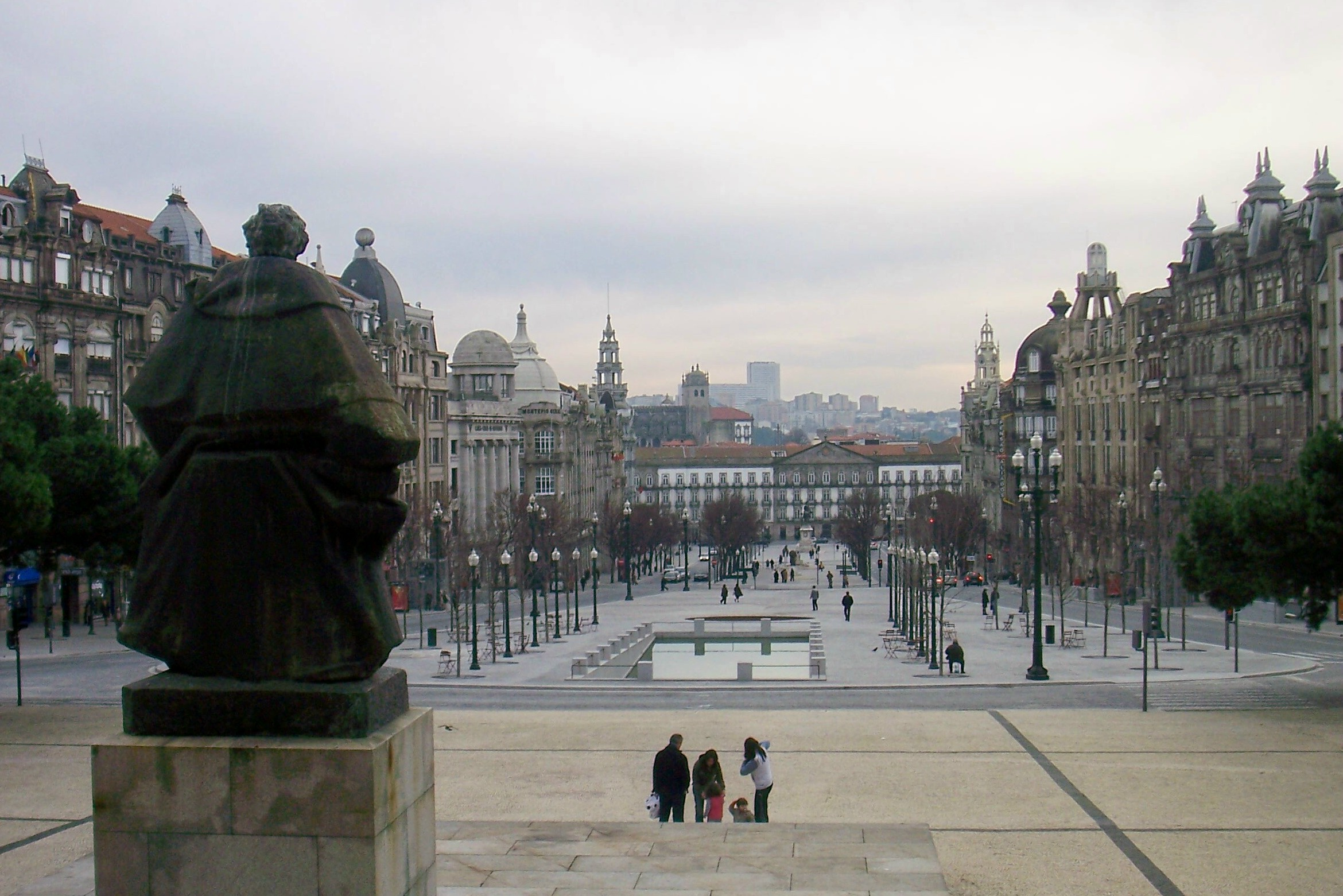
The headquarters of the metropolitan area are located in Avenida dos Aliados.

The metropolitan area is governed by the Junta Metropolitana do Porto (JMP), headquartered in Avenida dos Aliados, in downtown Porto. The current President of the Metro area is Pedro Duarte (PSD), also the mayor of Porto.

The Conselho Metropolitano do Porto (Porto Metropolitan Council) is composed by the 17 mayors of the municipalities that integrate the Metropolitan Area: 8 mayors from the Socialist Party (PS), 8 from the Social Democratic Party (PSD) and 1 from the CDS – People's Party (CDS–PP).

Although the government has halted the intention of creating new metropolitan areas and urban communities, it is keen to ensure greater autonomy to Porto and Lisbon metropolitan areas.

== Urban areas and agglomeration ==
The Porto metropolitan area is the second largest metropolitan area of Portugal, with about 1.8 million people. It groups the larger Porto Urban Area, the second largest in the country, assembled by the municipalities of Porto, Matosinhos, Vila Nova de Gaia, Gondomar, Valongo and Maia. It also includes three smaller urban areas: Póvoa de Varzim-Vila do Conde, Trofa-Santo Tirso and Santa Maria da Feira-São João da Madeira-Oliveira de Azeméis.

The urban-metropolitan agglomeration known as Porto Metropolitan Arch is a regional urban system of polycentric nature that encompasses the Porto Metropolitan Area and the sub-regions of Cávado, Ave and Tâmega e Sousa, including cities such as Braga and Guimarães.

== Population ==
Historical population
Year	Pop.	±%
1864	363,369	—
1878	408,870	+12.5%
1890	487,144	+19.1%
1900	537,709	+10.4%
1911	622,129	+15.7%
1920	652,275	+4.8%
1930	754,273	+15.6%
1940	882,665	+17.0%
1950	1,000,941	+13.4%
1960	1,144,641	+14.4%
1970	1,271,463	+11.1%
1981	1,516,011	+19.2%
1991	1,595,762	+5.3%
2001	1,730,845	+8.5%
2011	1,759,524	+1.7%
2021	1,736,293	−1.3%
2024	1,856,220	+6.9%
2025	1,861,727	+0.3%
Source: INE

Municipality	Area (km²)	Population (2025)
Arouca	329.11	21,459
Espinho	21.06	32,455
Gondomar	131.86	170,597
Maia	82.99	142,129
Matosinhos	62.42	181,930
Oliveira de Azeméis	161.10	70,027
Paredes	156.76	88,858
Porto	41.42	273,476
Póvoa de Varzim	82.21	72,364
Santa Maria da Feira	215.88	142,676
Santo Tirso	136.60	69,810
São João da Madeira	7.94	23,991
Trofa	72.02	41,512
Vale de Cambra	147.33	22,066
Valongo	75.12	98,930
Vila do Conde	149.03	86,245
Vila Nova de Gaia	168.46	323,202
Total	2,040.31 km²	1,861,727

== Transportation ==
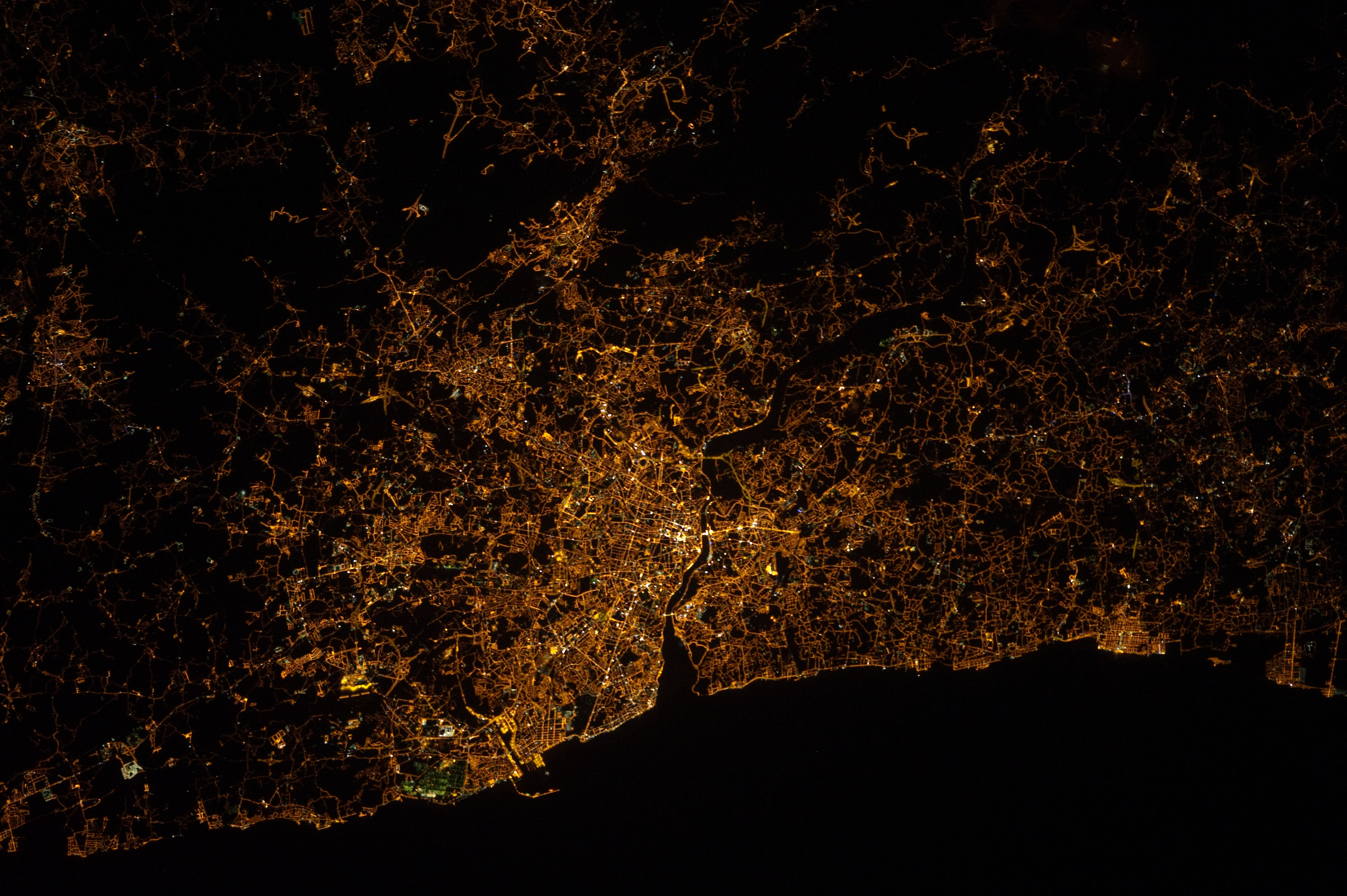
Porto Urban Area at night, as seen from space

The Metropolitan area is keen to develop its transportation network. Porto Metro is a Rapid transit system that links the municipalities of Porto, Vila Nova de Gaia, Matosinhos, Gondomar, Maia, Vila do Conde and Póvoa de Varzim.

The Porto/ Francisco de Sá Carneiro Airport / Pedras Rubras (OPO), between the municipalities of Maia, Matosinhos, and Vila do Conde, is also one of its greater investments. It was transformed from an old and obsolete airport to a modern transportation centre, linked to Porto Metro. The JMP is also trying to pressure the government to add a TGV line to link Vigo in Galicia to Porto Airport in order to make Porto the air traffic centre of the North-Western Iberian Peninsula and to tighten its historical ties with that Spanish province.

Greater Porto is served by a great number of Motorways linking the main central areas of the metropolitan region and the region with other main Portuguese cities (cidades portuguesas). Main Harbour: Leixões (Matosinhos). Motorways:

- A1 - Lisbon - Porto (North Motorway)
- A3 - Porto - Valença
- A4 - Porto - Quintanilha/Espanha
- A7 - Póvoa de Varzim - Vila Pouca de Aguiar
- A20 - Carvalhos - Nó de Francos (CRIP - Porto Inner-Ring Motorway)
- A28 - Porto - Caminha (Northern Littoral Motorway)
- A29 - Angeja - Porto
- A32 - Oliveira de Azeméis - Porto
- A41 - Perafita - Espinho (CREP - Porto Outer-Ring Motorway)
- A42 - A41 - Felgueiras
- A43 - Porto (A-20) - Aguiar de Sousa
- A44 - Gulpilhares (A29) - A20
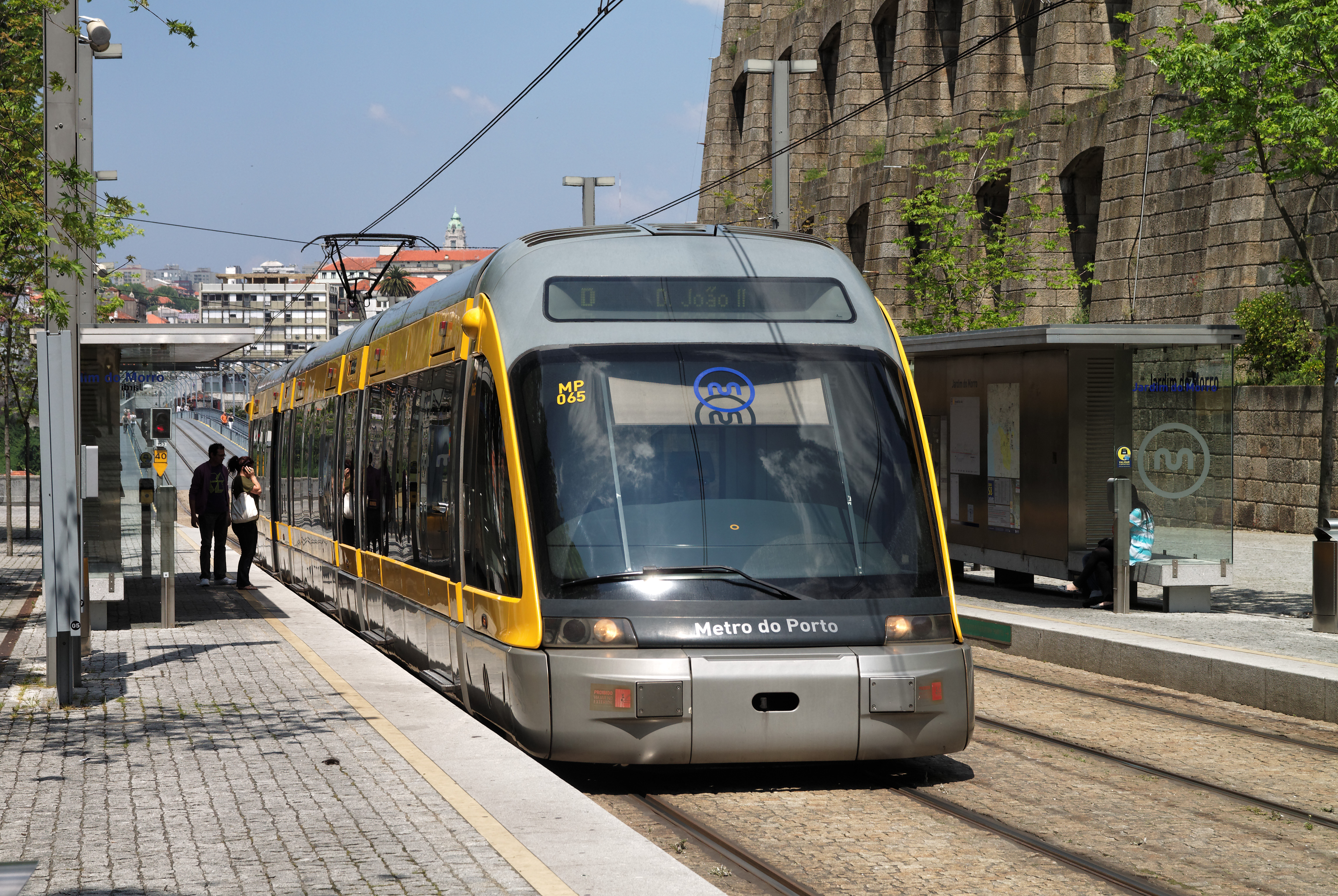
Porto Metro network reaches seven municipalities of the metropolitan area.

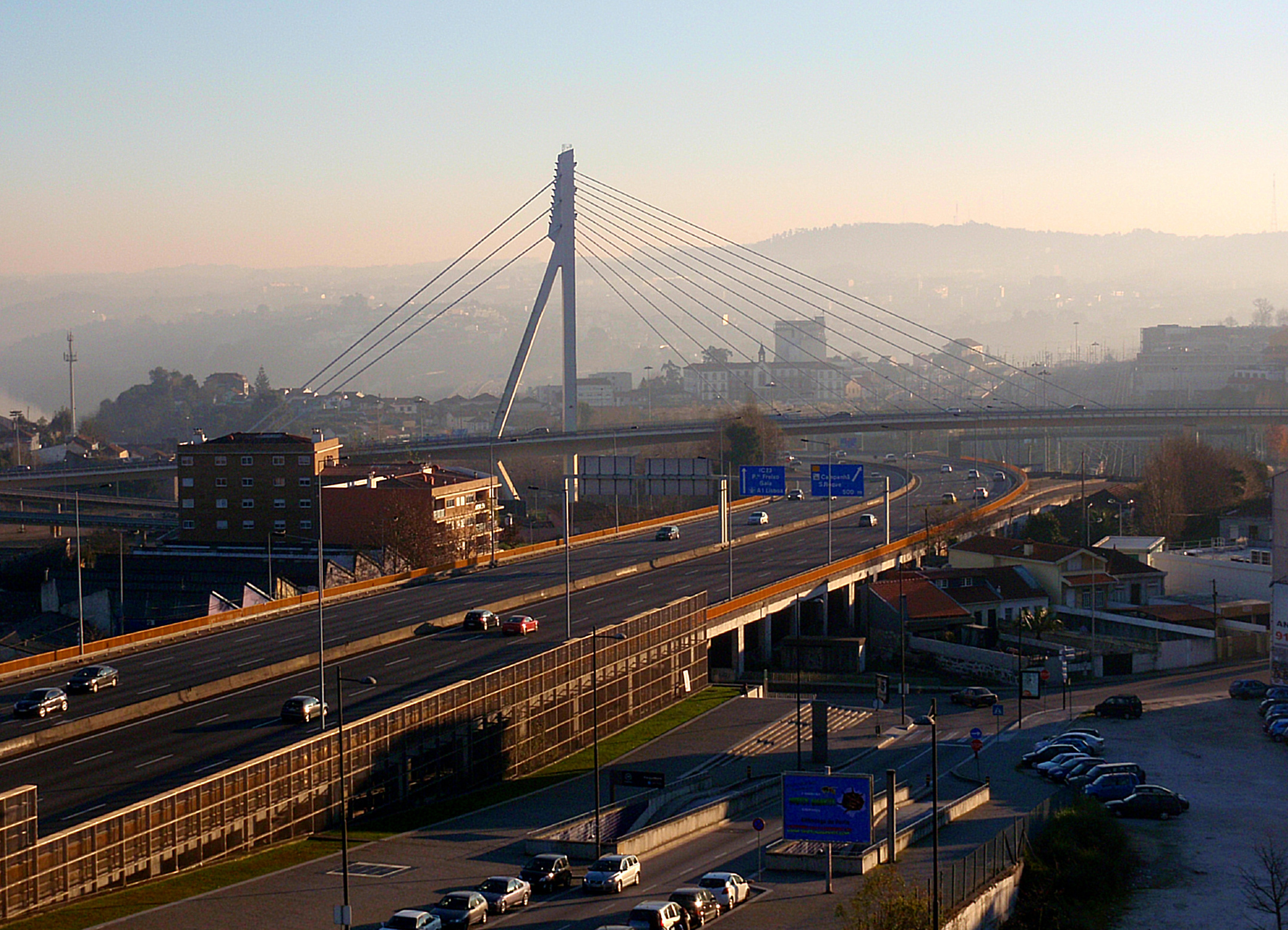
A20 motorway, Porto's Inner-Ring Motorway.

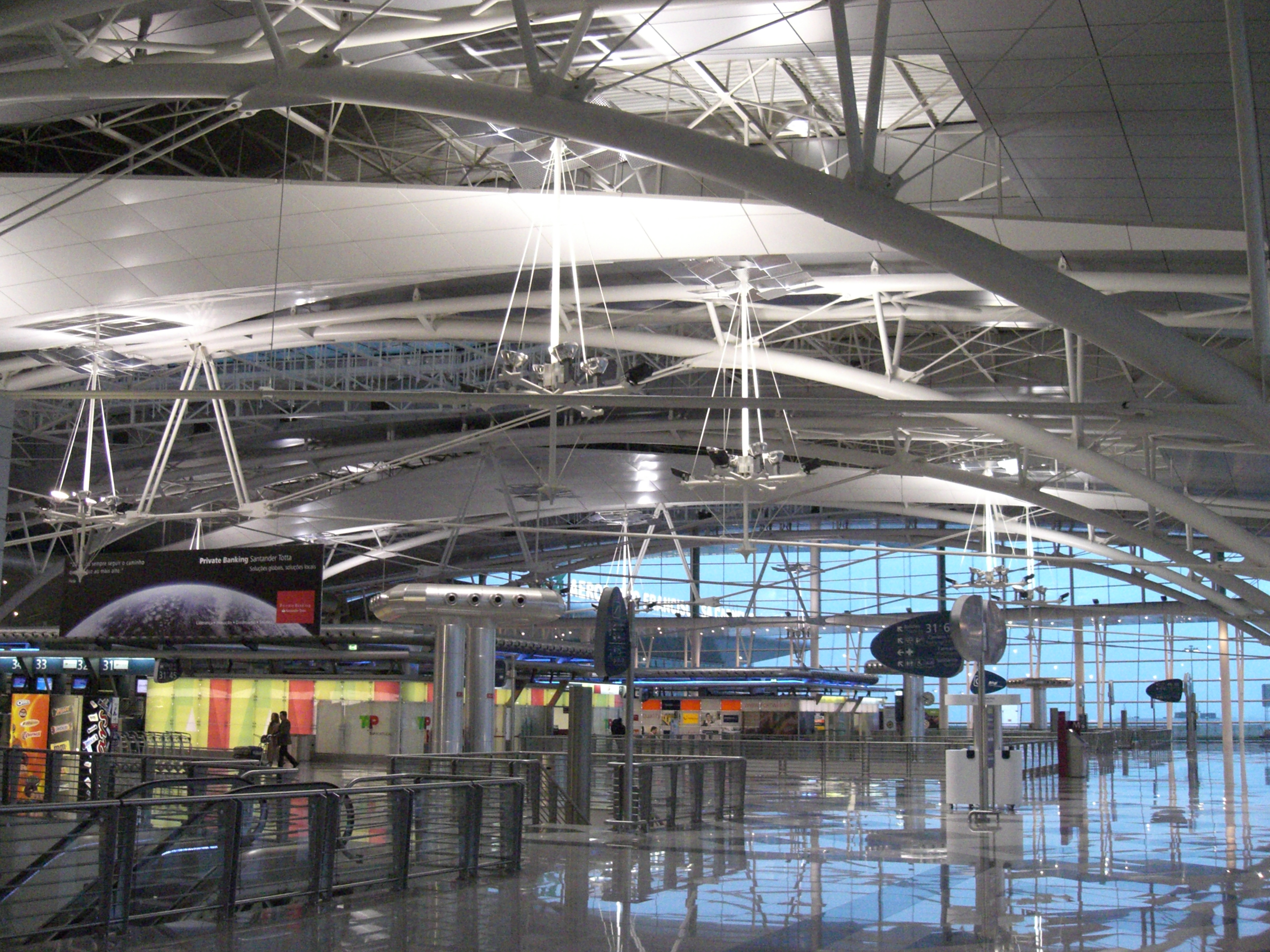
Francisco de Sá Carneiro Airport handles 17 million passengers per year.

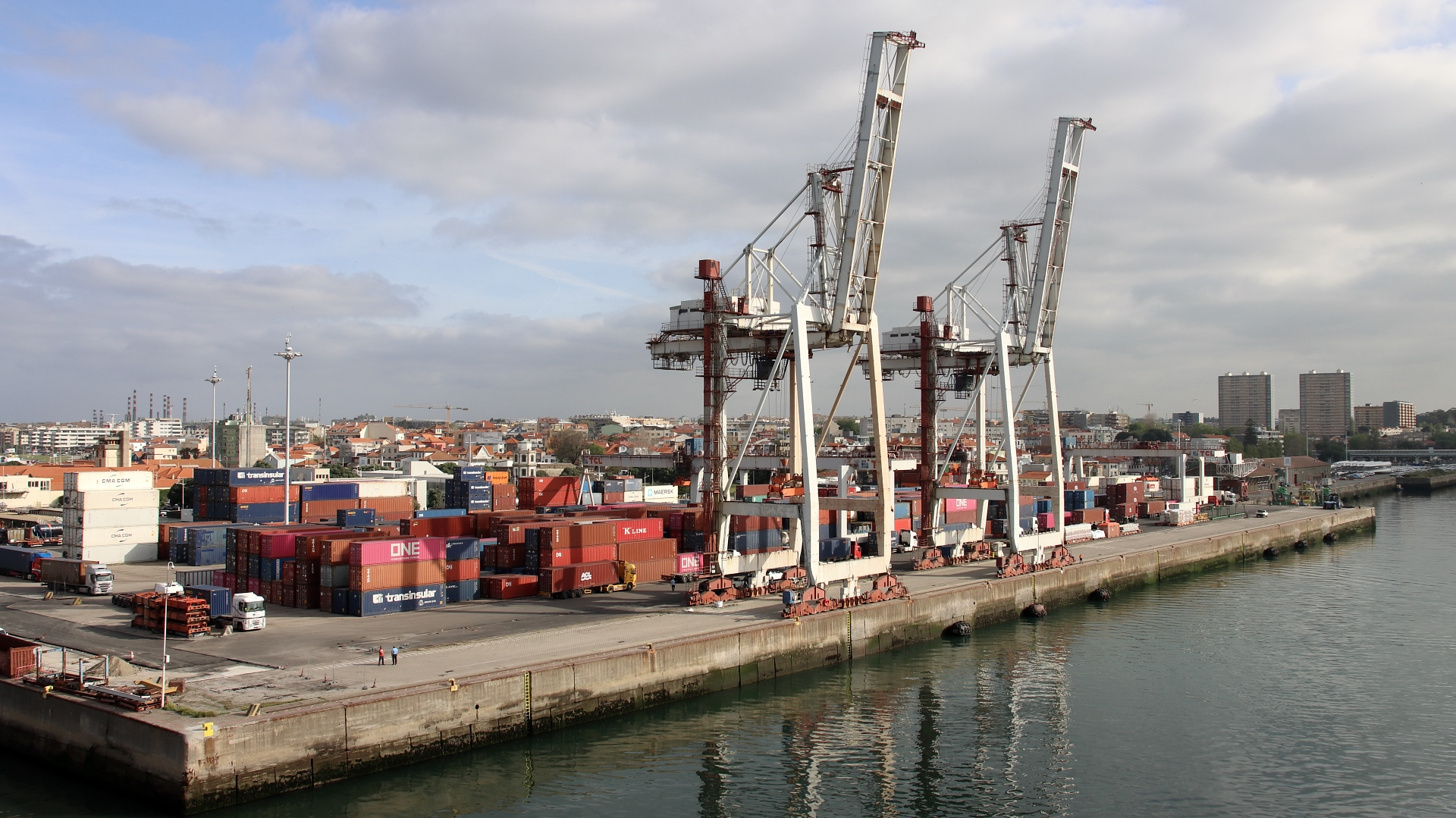
Leixões harbour in Matosinhos.

== See also ==
- Metropolitan areas in Portugal
- Porto Metro
- Porto Canal
- Grande Porto
- Entre Douro e Vouga
- Serras do Porto Park
