= List of shipwrecks in 1934 =

The list of shipwrecks in 1934 includes ships sunk, foundered, grounded, or otherwise lost during 1934.

table of contents
1934
Jan	Feb	Mar	Apr
May	Jun	Jul	Aug
Sep	Oct	Nov	Dec
Unknown date

== January ==
=== 1 January ===
List of shipwrecks: 1 January 1934
Ship	State	Description
Catherine	United States	The schooner caught fire at Canso, Nova Scotia, Canada, and was a total loss.
White Bear	United States	While on a voyage from Killisnoo to Hood Bay, Territory of Alaska, the 27-gross register ton, 45.3-foot (13.8 m) fishing vessel struck a rock during a snowstorm and sank in 210 feet (64 m) of water near Killisnoo Island in the Alexander Archipelago in Southeast Alaska. Both people on board survived

=== 3 January ===
List of shipwrecks: 3 January 1934
Ship	State	Description
Arpad	Hungary	The 3,891 GRT cargo ship on a voyage from Sfax to Japan with a cargo of phosphates, sprang a leak in the Indian Ocean (16°45′S 88°20′E) and was abandoned. The crew were rescued by Levernbank (United Kingdom).
Indian City	United Kingdom	The cargo ship ran aground at Constanţa, Romania. She was refloated on 8 January.

=== 4 January ===
List of shipwrecks: 4 January 1934
Ship	State	Description
Ceres	Germany	The 660 GRT coaster on passage from Königsberg for Rotterdam with general cargo, collided with Chagres (United Kingdom) off Hook of Holland, Netherlands and was beached.
Topmast No.1	United Kingdom	The hopper barge came ashore at Hove, Sussex. She was refloated on 13 January, but broke moorings in heavy seas on the following morning and was badly damaged when again going ashore.

=== 5 January ===
List of shipwrecks: 5 January 1934
Ship	State	Description
Paris City	United Kingdom	The cargo ship ran aground in the Tsugaru Strait near Omasake, Japan. She was refloated on 8 January.

=== 6 January ===
List of shipwrecks: 6 January 1934
Ship	State	Description
Torlak	Norway	The cargo ship sprang a leak and was abandoned in the Norwegian Sea (64°50′N 8°10′E). All crew were rescued by Queen's Cross (United Kingdom) which was towing the ship to Rosyth, Argyllshire, United Kingdom for scrapping. Torlak was towed into Bodø, Nordland by Hadsel (Norway), where she was beached. She was refloated on 29 January.

=== 7 January ===
List of shipwrecks: 7 January 1934
Ship	State	Description
Erling Lindøe	Norway	The cargo ship collided with Hakone Maru (Japan) in the River Thames at Belvedere, Kent, United Kingdom and sank. All crew survived. She was refloated on 18 January.

=== 11 January ===
List of shipwrecks: 11 January 1934
Ship	State	Description
Hemnes	Norway	The 1,166 GRT cargo ship on a voyage from Rotterdam to Bilbao with a cargo of coke, ran aground and foundered at Calia Point near Bilbao due to navigational error. The master was reprimanded.

=== 12 January ===
List of shipwrecks: 12 January 1934
Ship	State	Description
Goncalves Zarco	Portugal	The auxiliary sailing ship was wrecked at San Thiago, Cape Verde Islands.
HMS Nelson	Royal Navy	The Nelson-class battleship ran aground off Portsmouth, Hampshire, England.

=== 14 January ===
List of shipwrecks: 14 January 1934
Ship	State	Description
Albatros	France	The 238 GRT three-mast schooner on a voyage from Lisbon for Gravelines with a cargo of salt, ran aground and was wrecked near Calais.
Sagamore	United States	The 2,592 GRT cargo ship on a passage from Portland for New York with general cargo, struck Corwin Rock off Prouts Neck, Scarborough, Maine, during a storm and sank without loss of life in 40 to 50 feet (12 to 15 m) of water 300 yards (270 m) off the south end of Jordan's Beach.

=== 15 January ===
List of shipwrecks: 15 January 1934
Ship	State	Description
Paris Maru	Japan	The 7,197 GRT cargo ship, on a voyage to Cape Town with general cargo, struck Roman Rock after leaving Port Elizabeth. The ship rapidly filled with water and attempts to tow the ship back to port were unsuccessful due to rough seas. The ship subsequently foundered, and the wreck was later blown up as a danger to navigation.

=== 16 January ===
List of shipwrecks: 16 January 1934
Ship	State	Description
Plawsworth	United Kingdom	The cargo ship was driven ashore at Workington, Cumberland. All eighteen crew survived. She was refloated on 30 January.

=== 17 January ===
List of shipwrecks: 17 January 1934
Ship	State	Description
Chancellor	United Kingdom	The 105.6-foot (32.2 m), 168 GRT steam trawler stranded in bad weather and poor visibility in Whitsand Bay near Withnoe Point, Rame Head and was wrecked.
Dinorwic	United Kingdom	The coaster capsized at Bideford, Devon.
Oakford	United Kingdom	The 669 GRT coaster on a passage from Ghent for Delfzijl in ballast, ran aground off Vlieland, Friesland, Netherlands and was wrecked with the loss of nine crew.

=== 18 January ===
List of shipwrecks: 18 January 1934
Ship	State	Description
Brereton	United Kingdom	The 461 GRT coaster on a passage from Lossiemouth for Barry with a cargo of oats, ran aground on Carrick Rocks, south of Rosslare Harbour, County Wexford and was a total loss.
Leverkusen	Germany	The cargo ship collided with Frederiksborg (Denmark) at Rotterdam, Netherlands and was beached

=== 19 January ===
List of shipwrecks: 19 January 1934
Ship	State	Description
Brion	Netherlands	The 761 GRT coaster on a voyage from Guayaquil for Cristóbal with general cargo, sprang a leak and capsized in the Panama Canal near the Gatun Locks.

=== 22 January ===
List of shipwrecks: 22 January 1934
Ship	State	Description
Harptree Combe	United Kingdom	The coaster ran aground at Bideford, Devon. She was refloated on 31 January.

=== 23 January ===
List of shipwrecks: 23 January 1934
Ship	State	Description
Hadrian	Norway	The cargo ship ran aground at Gandia, Valencia, Spain.

=== 24 January ===
List of shipwrecks: 24 January 1934
Ship	State	Description
Aquitania	United Kingdom	The ocean liner ran aground in the Solent. She was refloated later that day.
Porthcarrack	United Kingdom	The coaster ran aground at Quimper, Finistère, France. She was refloated on 31 January.
T. P. Tilling	United Kingdom	The coaster ran aground at Silloth, Cumberland. She was refloated on 29 January.

=== 25 January ===
List of shipwrecks: 25 January 1934
Ship	State	Description
Edda	Iceland	The 997 GRT cargo ship on a voyage from Torrevieja for Djúpivogur with a cargo of salt, came ashore at Hornafjörður and was wrecked. The crew were rescued. She was declared a total loss.
Gnat	United Kingdom	The tug collided with August Cords (Germany) in the River Thames at Northfleet, Kent and sank with the loss of two of her four crew.
Winnipeg	United Kingdom	The Thames barge collided with Dennis Rose (United Kingdom) in the River Thames at Plumstead, London. Although taken in tow by Culex (United Kingdom) she subsequently sank.

=== 26 January ===
List of shipwrecks: 26 January 1934
Ship	State	Description
Sabik	United Kingdom	The 138.5-foot (42.2 m), 326 GRT trawler, a sold off Mersey-class naval trawler, was sunk in a collision with trawler Euthamia (United Kingdom) off Dyrafjord, Iceland. 12 crew killed, 2 rescued by "Euthamia".

=== 29 January ===
List of shipwrecks: 29 January 1934
Ship	State	Description
Chungshing	China	The cargo liner was crushed by ice and sank in the Bohai Sea (approximately 38°N 119°E). All passengers and crew were rescued.

== February ==
=== 31 January ===
List of shipwrecks: 31 January 1934
Ship	State	Description
Yrsa	Denmark	The 845 GRT coaster on a voyage from Girgenti for London with a cargo of gypsum, struck some flotsam and sank off Cabo Touriñán.

=== 1 February ===
List of shipwrecks: 1 February 1934
Ship	State	Description
Catalonia	Sweden	The 1,512 GRT cargo ship departed Venice for Rouen with a cargo of pitch. A lifebelt washed up at Bari, Apulia on 19 February. Other wreckage came ashore between 16 and 19 February. Presumed foundered in the Adriatic Sea with all hands.
Phi Ho	France	The 415 GRT coaster on a passage from Haiphong for Bến Thủy with a cargo of rice, ran aground and was wrecked near Kua Lo, Annam.

=== 2 February ===
List of shipwrecks: 2 February 1934
Ship	State	Description
Parramatta	Australia	The former River-class torpedo-boat destroyer/prison hulk broke loose from her tow in a storm while on her way to the breakers yard and went aground near Milson Island about one kilometre (0.62 mi) from Hawkesbury River Road bridge, on the western side of the Hawkesbury River and was abandoned. Her stern and bow were salvaged in 1973 for memorials, the rest of the wreck remains in place.
Swan	Australia	The former River-class torpedo-boat destroyer/prison hulk broke loose from her tow in a storm while on her way to the breakers yard, her hull filling with rainwater until capsizing and sinking west of Juno Point at Little Wobby in the Hawkesbury River.

=== 6 February ===
List of shipwrecks: 6 February 1934
Ship	State	Description
Eika	Norway	The 695 GRT coaster departed from Dunston for Murviken with a cargo of coal and coke. No further trace, presumed foundered with the loss of all hands. Wreckage, lifebuoys, a lifeboat and the bodies of 2 crew washed ashore on the Norwegian coast at a later date.
Ryvingen	Norway	The 590 GRT coaster departed from Methil, Fife for Klaksvík, Faroe Islands with a cargo of coal and coke. No further trace, presumed foundered with the loss of all hands.

=== 7 February ===
List of shipwrecks: 7 February 1934
Ship	State	Description
Marion Traber	Germany	The cargo ship ran aground on the Hermit Rocks, Firth of Forth, United Kingdom. She was refloated on 13 February.
San Miguel	Spain	The barque ran aground at Faramant, France. She was refloated on 14 February, found to be severely damaged and drydocked at Marseille, Bouches-du-Rhône.

=== 8 February ===
List of shipwrecks: 8 February 1934
Ship	State	Description
Disperser	United Kingdom	The 139 GRT salvage vessel on a passage from Whitby for Ramsgate in ballast, foundered in the North Sea about 6.5 nautical miles (12.0 km) off Staithes, Yorkshire while under tow. All seven crew were rescued by Trover (United Kingdom).
Evelyn	Norway	The 114 GRT coaster on a passage from Trondheim for Stavanger with a cargo of lumber, ran aground and sank near Bjørnsund while navigating down Hustadvika in a heavy snowstorm. The crew was saved by local fishing boats.
Hanestrom III	Sweden	The cargo ship ran aground at Thyborøn, Jutland, Denmark. All crew were rescued.
Magdalena	Germany	The cargo ship ran aground at Klein Curaçao, Netherlands Antilles. She was refloated on 28 May.

=== 9 February ===
List of shipwrecks: 9 February 1934
Ship	State	Description
Flevomeer	Netherlands	The 338 GRT coaster on a voyage from Fredericia for Nyköping with 105 tons of rye, ran aground at Isefjord in stormy weather. She was refloated on 19 February and arrived at Nyköping the next day. The ship remained there until 10 April undergoing temporary repairs, and then sailed to Rotterdam. After examination, the vessel was found to be too heavily damaged, and was sold for scrapping.

=== 10 February ===
List of shipwrecks: 10 February 1934
Ship	State	Description
Dimitrios L. Daniolos	Greece	The cargo ship collided with Anna Vassilaki (Greece) at Çanakkale, Turkey and was beached. She was refloated the next day.
Konstantinos	Greece	The barge foundered off Karystos with the loss of three crew.
Noreg	Sweden	The cargo ship ran aground on the Soren Jessens Sand, off Fanø, Denmark. The crew were rescued.

=== 11 February ===
List of shipwrecks: 11 February 1934
Ship	State	Description
Anfitrite	Italy	The 4,921 GRT cargo ship on a passage from Ancona for Traghetto in ballast, ran aground on the Medolino Shoals off Pola. Later refloated but abandoned as a total loss.

=== 12 February ===
List of shipwrecks: 12 February 1934
Ship	State	Description
Meandros	Greece	The 4,309 GRT cargo ship on a voyage from Rosario for Amsterdam with a cargo of grain, collided with Dartford (United Kingdom) in the English Channel off St. Catherine's Point, Isle of Wight. One survivor was rescued by Dartford, and 27 were rescued by Eleth (United Kingdom).
Saturn	Germany	The cargo ship foundered at Danzig.
Varholm	Norway	The cargo ship came ashore at Jæren, Norway and was wrecked. The crew were rescued.

=== 13 February ===
List of shipwrecks: 13 February 1934
Ship	State	Description
Chelyuskin	Soviet Union	The cargo ship was crushed by ice and sank in the Chukchi Sea 155 nautical miles (287 km) off Cape Syevenoi with the loss of one of the 104 people on board.
Hardy	Norway	The 755 GRT coaster on a passage from Gdynia for Kilrush with a cargo of coal, foundered in the Baltic Sea about 2.5 nautical miles (4.6 km) off Heisternest.
Rosa Luxemburg	Soviet Union	The cargo ship collided with Lifland (Denmark) in the English Channel. She was beached at Netley, Hampshire, United Kingdom. Subsequently repaired and returned to service.

=== 15 February ===
List of shipwrecks: 15 February 1934
Ship	State	Description
Sara	United Kingdom	The Thames barge collided with Wandle (United Kingdom) in the River Thames at the West India Docks and sank.

=== 16 February ===
List of shipwrecks: 16 February 1934
Ship	State	Description
Black Dwarf	United Kingdom	The coaster ran aground in the River Severn at Sharpness, Gloucestershire. She was refloated on 15 March.
Wallsend	United Kingdom	The 2,851 GRT cargo ship on a voyage from Antwerp for Beirut with general cargo, was driven ashore at Caesarea, Palestine. Salvage attempts were abandoned on 5 April and she was declared a total loss.

=== 17 February ===
List of shipwrecks: 17 February 1934
Ship	State	Description
Ramsholm	Norway	The 1,435 GRT cargo ship on a voyage from Sousa for Rotterdam with a cargo of phosphates, collided with Stancor (Latvia) in the English Channel 20 nautical miles (37 km) south of St Catherine's Point, Isle of Wight and sank. All seventeen crew were rescued by Stancor.

=== 18 February ===
List of shipwrecks: 18 February 1934
Ship	State	Description
Lochiel	United Kingdom	The cargo ship struck a rock off Bruichladdich, Islay, Inner Hebrides and was holed. She was consequently beached off Bowmore. She was refloated the next day.
Tokiwa Maru No.2	Japan	The 885 GRT coaster on a voyage from Mashike for Tsuruga with a cargo of manure, ran aground in Tsugaru Strait. She broke in two on 23 February and was a total loss.

=== 19 February ===
List of shipwrecks: 19 February 1934
Ship	State	Description
Banyei Maru	Japan	The 2,779 GRT cargo ship on a voyage from Muroran for Seikoshin with a cargo of coal, issued S.O.S. Search failed to find the vessel, presumed foundered in the Sea of Japan off Konan (approximately 40°N 132°E) with the loss of all hands.
Canby	United Kingdom	The 4,804 GRT cargo ship on a passage from St. John for Louisbourg in ballast, ran aground east of Guion Island, Nova Scotia Canada. She was abandoned as a total loss on 21 March.
Commercial Guide	United States	The cargo ship caught fire at New Orleans, Louisiana and was beached outside the port.
Glenshesk	United Kingdom	The cargo ship ran aground at Lannion, Brittany, France. She was refloated on 3 March.
Wuppertal	Germany	The 301 GRT trawler ran aground and was wrecked at Andøya, south-east of Andenes, Norway (69°16′N 16°11′E).

=== 20 February ===
List of shipwrecks: 20 February 1934
Ship	State	Description
Northern Sword	United States	The cargo ship ran aground at Winthrop Head, Massachusetts. She was refloated on 27 February.
Urania	Italy	The cargo ship ran aground in Marajó Bay, Brazil. She was refloated on 24 February.

=== 21 February ===
List of shipwrecks: 21 February 1934
Ship	State	Description
Swifteagle	United States	The 8,207 GRT tanker on a voyage from San Pedro for New York with a cargo of oil, ran aground on Islas San Benito, Mexico. She was damaged by a gale on 27 February and was consequently declared a total loss.

=== 22 February ===
List of shipwrecks: 22 February 1934
Ship	State	Description
Grit	United Kingdom	The 193 GRT coaster on a passage from Keadby for Exeter with a cargo of coal, collided with another ship in the English Channel off Sandgate and sank. All six crew were rescued by the Hythe lifeboat City of Nottingham ( Royal National Lifeboat Institution).

=== 23 February ===
List of shipwrecks: 23 February 1934
Ship	State	Description
Pollux	Norway	The cargo ship ran aground at Jaffa, Palestine. She was refloated on 17 or 18 March.

=== 26 February ===
List of shipwrecks: 26 February 1934
Ship	State	Description
Bangor	United Kingdom	The 340 GRT coaster on a passage from Portland for Belfast with a cargo of stone, stranded at Ballyquinton Point and subsequently sank in the Irish Sea off South Rock, County Down. The crew survived.
Fauvette	United Kingdom	The 890 GRT coaster on a passage from Antwerp for London with general cargo, collided with Penelope (Panama) in the North Sea 40 nautical miles (74 km) east of North Foreland, Kent (51°28′N 2°13′E) and sank. All twenty people on board were rescued by Penelope.

=== 27 February ===
List of shipwrecks: 27 February 1934
Ship	State	Description
Liebre	United States	The tanker ran aground in the Delaware River at Philadelphia, Pennsylvania. She was refloated on 2 March.

=== 28 February ===
List of shipwrecks: 28 February 1934
Ship	State	Description
Cieszyn	Poland	The passenger ship ran aground at Porkkala, Finland.

== March ==
=== 5 March ===
List of shipwrecks: 5 March 1934
Ship	State	Description
Bilbeis	United Kingdom	The 2,737 GRT cargo ship on a voyage from Alexandria for Mersin with general cargo ran aground and was wrecked at Kuza Khana, near Jaffa.
Concordia	United Kingdom	The 5,391 GRT cargo ship on a voyage from St. John for Clyde with a cargo of grain, collided with Black Eagle (United States) in the Atlantic Ocean 40 nautical miles (74 km) southeast of Sable Island and sank. All crew were rescued by Black Eagle.
Santoni	Italy	The 5,235 GRT tanker on a voyage from Batumi for Genoa with a cargo of gasoline, ran aground 3.5 kilometres (1.9 nmi) south of "Carol I" lighthouse, Constanţa, Romania in strong gale, broke in two and sank. Eleven crew were killed attempting to abandon the ship.

=== 7 March ===
List of shipwrecks: 7 March 1934
Ship	State	Description
Emil	Spain	The schooner sprang a leak and sank at Sagunto, Valencia.

=== 8 March ===
List of shipwrecks: 8 March 1934
Ship	State	Description
Thelma M	United States	The 10-gross register ton, 31-foot (9.4 m) fishing vessel sank off Portage Island (57°01′10″N 133°20′50″W) in Southeast Alaska. Her three crewmen survived.

=== 9 March ===
List of shipwrecks: 9 March 1934
Ship	State	Description
Bealiba	United Kingdom	The coaster ran aground at Norah Head, New South Wales, Australia. All crew were rescued.
Myotaian Maru	Japan	The 1,282 GRT cargo ship ran aground at Loochoo and was wrecked.

=== 10 March ===
List of shipwrecks: 10 March 1934
Ship	State	Description
Sculcoates	United Kingdom	The 337 GRT steam trawler on a fishing trip ran aground on the rocks off Kildin Island in thick snow, and subsequently sank (69°21′N 34°20′E). The crew was saved by trawler Lord Beaverbrook (United Kingdom).

=== 12 March ===
List of shipwrecks: 12 March 1934
Ship	State	Description
Aviz	Portugal	The coaster collided with the harbour wall at Leixões and was beached. She was refloated on 22 April.
Svale	United Kingdom	The passenger ship struck a rock off Foochow, China and was beached. Passengers were rescued by a Chinese cruiser. She was plundered by local inhabitants and abandoned as a total loss.
Tomozuru	Imperial Japanese Navy	The torpedo boat capsized with the loss of 100 lives off Sasebo, Japan, during a night torpedo exercise in stormy weather. She was towed to Sasebo on 13 March and was righted, repaired, and returned to service.

=== 13 March ===
List of shipwrecks: 13 March 1934
Ship	State	Description
Prince Henry	Canada	The ocean liner ran aground at St. George's, Bermuda.

=== 14 March ===
List of shipwrecks: 14 March 1934
Ship	State	Description
USS Fulton	United States Navy	The Fulton-class submarine tender caught fire in the South China Sea. All 135 crew were rescued by Tsinan (United Kingdom) and HMS Wishart (Royal Navy). She was towed to Hong Kong but declared a constructive total loss.

=== 15 March ===
List of shipwrecks: 15 March 1934
Ship	State	Description
Herefordshire	United Kingdom	The cargo ship ran aground on Cardigan Island, Cardiganshire, a total loss.
Oscar Edu	Panama	The coaster foundered off the coast of County Galway, Ireland (50°50′N 8°25′W) with the loss of seven of her twelve crew. Survivors were rescued by Inverarder (United Kingdom).

=== 17 March ===
List of shipwrecks: 17 March 1934
Ship	State	Description
Clodoald	France	The 796 GRT coaster on a voyage from Brest for Bayonne with general cargo, came ashore at Saint-Jean-de-Luz, Pyrénées-Atlantique and was wrecked with the loss of one crewmember.

=== 18 March ===
List of shipwrecks: 18 March 1934
Ship	State	Description
Atlantide	Kingdom of Italy	The 3,555 GRT cargo ship on a voyage from Huelva for Sluiskil stranded at Dafundo in Tagus River. Later refloated but sold for scrapping due to heavy damage. Broken up at Savona in July 1934.

=== 19 March ===
List of shipwrecks: 19 March 1934
Ship	State	Description
Gundulic	Yugoslavia	The 5,291 GRT cargo ship on a passage from Rosario for Coronel ran aground and was wrecked at Puerto Bueno, Smyth Channel, Chile. Later bought by the Chilean Navy, refloated and returned to service as Magallanes in 1945.

=== 20 March ===
List of shipwrecks: 20 March 1934
Ship	State	Description
Otranto	Italy	The 2,056 GRT cargo ship on a voyage from Venice for Shanghai with a cargo of machinery, struck a submerged object and subsequently foundered in the South China Sea (15°00′N 119°43′E).

=== 21 March ===
List of shipwrecks: 21 March 1934
Ship	State	Description
Wearbridge	United Kingdom	The cargo ship ran aground off Hakodate, Japan. She was refloated on 4 April.

=== 22 March ===
List of shipwrecks: 22 March 1934
Ship	State	Description
Girafe	France	The tanker exploded and sank at Port-Jérôme, Seine Maritime with the loss of thirteen crew.

=== 25 March ===
List of shipwrecks: 25 March 1934
Ship	State	Description
Bantry	United Kingdom	The 604 GRT coaster on a passage from London for Poole, collided with Cardita (United Kingdom) in the English Channel 7 nautical miles (13 km) south of Selsey Bill, Sussex (50°36′N 0°46′W) and sank with the loss of six of her ten crew.
Stella	Estonia	The 3,159 GRT cargo ship on a voyage from Antwerp for Spezia with a cargo of coal, collided with Bomarsund (Finland) in the English Channel 20 nautical miles (37 km) off Guernsey, and sank with the loss of three crew.

=== 27 March ===
List of shipwrecks: 27 March 1934
Ship	State	Description
Tsiropinas	Greece	The cargo ship collided with Doris (Greece) in the Bristol Channel off Barry, Glamorgan and was consequently beached in Whitmore Bay.

=== 28 March ===
List of shipwrecks: 28 March 1934
Ship	State	Description
Citta di Spezia	Italy	The cargo ship ran aground on Molara Island, Sardinia. She was refloated on 3 April.

=== 29 March ===
List of shipwrecks: 29 March 1934
Ship	State	Description
Fryser I	Norway	The sealer was abandoned in the Arctic Sea off Jan Mayen. She sank on 18 April.
Sophie Costala	Greece	The cargo ship caught fire at Piraeus. She was scuttled outside the port in order to extinguish the fire.

== April ==
=== 2 April ===
List of shipwrecks: 2 April 1934
Ship	State	Description
Jap	United Kingdom	The 246 GRT coaster was driven ashore at Cape Hawke, New South Wales, Australia and was wrecked while on a passage from Manning River for Sydney with a cargo of timber.
Mazout	United Kingdom	The tanker ran aground at Butrinto, Albania. She was refloated on 5 April.

=== 4 April ===
List of shipwrecks: 4 April 1934
Ship	State	Description
John A. Cooney	United States	The 30-gross register ton, 55-foot (16.8 m) cod-fishing vessel sank at "Nashawena Island." Some reports place the island in the Territory of Alaska, but in fact Nashawena Island is on the coast of Massachusetts. It is possible that the sinking occurred off Massachusetts or off Nakwasina Island in Sitka Sound in the Alexander Archipelago in Southeast Alaska.

=== 7 April ===
List of shipwrecks: 7 April 1934
Ship	State	Description
Yuen Shun	China	The 1,631 GRT cargo ship foundered in the East China Sea off Ningpo with the loss of 29 crew.

=== 8 April ===
List of shipwrecks: 8 April 1934
Ship	State	Description
Leonidas II	Greece	The 5,246 GRT cargo ship on a voyage from Danzig for Civitavecchia with a cargo of coal, ran aground at Ranzow, Germany. She was refloated on 7 May and subsequently broken up.

=== 9 April ===
List of shipwrecks: 9 April 1934
Ship	State	Description
Fillochard	France	The coaster foundered in the Bay of Biscay off Brest, Finistère. The crew were rescued by the trawler Ducouedic (France).

=== 12 April ===
List of shipwrecks: 12 April 1934
Ship	State	Description
Abelardo Rojas	Chile	The 476 GRT coaster on a voyage from Guayaquil for Arica with a cargo of bananas, caught fire and subsequently sank while about 15 nautical miles (28 km) off Chala.
Galatee	France	The schooner caught fire in the Atlantic Ocean (39°22′N 31°33′W) and was abandoned. The crew were rescued by Dagrun (Norway).
Guayas	Chile	The 265 GRT coaster caught fire in the Atlantic Ocean of Pisagua and sank.
Wolfgang	Germany	The auxiliary sailing ship foundered in the Baltic Sea off Stolpmünde, Pomerania, Germany. The crew were rescued.

=== 13 April ===
List of shipwrecks: 13 April 1934
Ship	State	Description
Kinjo Maru	Japan	The 1,410 GRT cargo ship on a voyage with a cargo of coal, collided with Chile Maru off Mutsure Island and sank. The crew were rescued.
Rio de Janeiro Maru	Japan	The cargo ship ran aground at Port Eads, Louisiana, United States. She was refloated on 18 April.
Toran	Norway	The cargo ship ran aground on Alden Island, Norway. She was refloated on 19 April.

=== 15 April ===
List of shipwrecks: 15 April 1934
Ship	State	Description
Midthordland	Norway	The 143 GRT coaster on a passage from Lindås for Masfjorden with general cargo and passengers, got stranded and subsequently sunk at Skogsøy.

=== 16 April ===
List of shipwrecks: 16 April 1934
Ship	State	Description
Mogami Maru	Japan	The 2,208 GRT cargo ship on a voyage from Yokohama for Keelung with a cargo of kerosene, caught fire and was lost while off Mikisaki Light, Mie-ken.

=== 17 April ===
List of shipwrecks: 17 April 1934
Ship	State	Description
Puszta	Hungary	The 3,733 GRT cargo ship on a passage from Providence for Key West in ballast, ran aground in fog on the northeast shore of Block Island off the coast of Rhode Island. Her wreck settled in 10 to 20 feet (3.0 to 6.1 m) of water at 41°13.04′N 071°33.27′W.

=== 21 April ===
List of shipwrecks: 21 April 1934
Ship	State	Description
Aymoré	Brazil	The 441 GRT coaster on a passage from Pará for Manaus with a cargo of gasoline, suffered an onboard explosion. She caught fire and was destroyed. All on board were rescued. Salvaged and rebuilt in 1935.

=== 23 April ===
List of shipwrecks: 23 April 1934
Ship	State	Description
Mayachi Maru	Japan	The cargo ship ran aground at Tsutzusaki. She was refloated on 23 May.

=== 25 April ===
List of shipwrecks: 25 April 1934
Ship	State	Description
Kassos	Greece	The cargo ship collided with Premuda (Italy) in the Bosporus and was consequently beached at Bebek, Istanbul, Turkey. She was refloated on 29 April.
Tonkin	France	The 1,542 GRT cargo ship on a trip from Hong Kong for Haiphong with general cargo and passengers, ran aground and was wrecked off Fort Bayard, Kwangchowan.

== May ==
=== 3 May ===
List of shipwrecks: 3 May 1934
Ship	State	Description
Castor	Netherlands	The coaster collided with the trawler Parthian (United Kingdom) in the North Sea off Grimsby, Lincolnshire and was consequently beached.

=== 5 May ===
List of shipwrecks: 5 May 1934
Ship	State	Description
Rutenfjell	Norway	The 1,570 GRT cargo ship on a trip from Bergen for Montreal with general cargo, ran aground and was wrecked at Cape Egmont in foggy weather. Later refloated and declared a total loss on 25 May. The master was fined for sailing too fast for conditions.

=== 7 May ===
List of shipwrecks: 7 May 1934
Ship	State	Description
Nambucca	United Kingdom	The 415 GRT coaster on a trip from Sydney for Nambucca River with general cargo, ran aground at Nambucca Heads, New South Wales in a gale. She was declared a total loss.
Walter Junior	United Kingdom	The ship sank in the Atlantic Ocean.

=== 9 May ===
List of shipwrecks: 9 May 1934
Ship	State	Description
Petrel	United Kingdom	The 192 GRT coaster on a voyage from Little Bras d'Or for Magdalen Islands with a cargo of coal, sprang a leak and was abandoned off Grand Entry, Nova Scotia, Canada.

=== 10 May ===
List of shipwrecks: 10 May 1934
Ship	State	Description
Vindex	Italy	The 332 GRT coaster, former Italian gunboat Faa di Bruno, sank off Oran, Algeria.

=== 11 May ===
List of shipwrecks: 11 May 1934
Ship	State	Description
King Loong	China	The cargo ship ran aground at Amoy. The crew abandoned ship and her captain committed suicide.

=== 13 May ===
List of shipwrecks: 13 May 1934
Ship	State	Description
Mercur	Germany	The tug collided with Albert Ballin (Germany) at Bremen, Germany, and sank.

=== 15 May ===
List of shipwrecks: 15 May 1934
Ship	State	Description
Louhi	Finland	The passenger ship capsized and sank in Lake Kallevesi with the loss of nineteen lives.
LV-117	United States Lighthouse Service	The 135-foot (41 m), 630-displacement ton lightvessel, operating as the Nantucket Lightship, sank in 180 feet (55 m) of water in the Atlantic Ocean 40 nautical miles (74 km; 46 mi) southeast of Nantucket with the loss of seven of her eleven crew after the passenger liner Olympic (United Kingdom) accidentally rammed her.

=== 17 May ===
List of shipwrecks: 17 May 1934
Ship	State	Description
Eugenio	Italy	The auxiliary three-masted schooner collided with Youngstown (United States) in the Ligunian Sea off Livorno, Tuscany and sank.

=== 18 May ===
List of shipwrecks: 18 May 1934
Ship	State	Description
Ronald M. Pearson	United Kingdom	The schooner came ashore on the east coast of Miquelon and was wrecked.

=== 20 May ===
List of shipwrecks: 20 May 1934
Ship	State	Description
Sam Weller	United Kingdom	The Thames barge collided with Ardgryfe (United Kingdom) in the River Thames at Blackwall and sank. She was raised the next day.

=== 22 May ===
List of shipwrecks: 22 May 1934
Ship	State	Description
Phyllis S	United States	The 46-gross register ton 59.7-foot (18.2 m) fishing vessel was wrecked in fog on the outer part of Left Cape (57°15′30″N 152°57′00″W) on the southeast coast of Kodiak Island in the Territory of Alaska. Her crew of three survived.

=== 26 May ===
List of shipwrecks: 26 May 1934
Ship	State	Description
Seneff	United Kingdom	The cargo ship sank at St. John's, Newfoundland due to a faulty condenser outlet. She was subsequently refloated.

=== 27 May ===
List of shipwrecks: 27 May 1934
Ship	State	Description
Elisabetha	United Kingdom	The barquentine was wrecked in the Agalega Islands, Mauritius. The crew survived.
Vaidava	Latvia	The 2,180 GRT cargo ship on a voyage from Windau for Swansea with a cargo of timber, ran aground in Llanelli Channel, Carmarthenshire. She broke her back and was a total loss.

=== 29 May ===
List of shipwrecks: 29 May 1934
Ship	State	Description
Assistance	France	The tug capsized and sank at Rouen, Seine-Inférieure whilst assisting Mirza (Netherlands).

== June ==
=== 1 June ===
List of shipwrecks: 1 June 1934
Ship	State	Description
Gertrud	Finland	The 1,691 GRT cargo ship on a passage from Manchester for Finland in ballast, ran aground on Stroma, Caithness and sank.
Pertusola	Italy	The cargo ship was wrecked at Punta Salina, Sardinia.
Skeldon	United Kingdom	The 1,337 GRT cargo ship on a trip from Port Talbot for St. Malo with a cargo of 1,600 tons of coal, ran aground on the rocks at the entrance into St. Malo harbor in foggy weather, and was wrecked.
Tomi Maru	Japan	The cargo ship ran aground on or near Pratas Island, China. She was refloated on 9 June.

=== 5 June ===
List of shipwrecks: 5 June 1934
Ship	State	Description
Maigue	United Kingdom	The coaster ran aground at Inniscrone, County Sligo, Ireland. She was refloated on 10 June.

=== 8 June ===
List of shipwrecks: 8 June 1934
Ship	State	Description
Wilhelmine	Germany	The tanker ran aground at Port Colborne, Ontario, Canada. She was refloated on 23 June but found to be severely damaged.

=== 9 June ===
List of shipwrecks: 9 June 1934
Ship	State	Description
Berengar	Germany	The cargo ship ran aground in the Paraná River, Brazil. She was refloated on 22 June.
Rostellan	Ireland	The coaster sank at the O'Bevine Lighthouse, Rathlin Island, County Antrim, United Kingdom.
Sprightly	United Kingdom	The cargo ship came ashore at Lyngby, Sjælland, Denmark. She was refloated on 18 June.

=== 10 June ===
List of shipwrecks: 10 June 1934
Ship	State	Description
Knut Hamsun	Norway	The cargo ship caught fire and sank in the Caribbean Sea 30 nautical miles (56 km) south west of the Roncador Bank. Seventeen of her 34 crew were rescued by Zacapa (United States).

=== 11 June ===
List of shipwrecks: 11 June 1934
Ship	State	Description
Aysen	Chile	The cargo ship was holed by her anchor and beached at Coquimbo. She was refloated the next day.
Frida	Germany	The schooner sprang a leak and sank off Lågskär, Finland. The crew survived.

=== 15 June ===
List of shipwrecks: 15 June 1934
Ship	State	Description
Fauna	United Kingdom	The schooner sprang a leak and sank in the Caribbean Sea off Baliceau, Saint Vincent.

=== 16 June ===
List of shipwrecks: 16 June 1934
Ship	State	Description
Invercloy	United Kingdom	The cargo ship ran aground off the Arranman Barrels Lighthouse, Mull of Kintyre, Argyllshire. The crew were rescued.

=== 17 June ===
List of shipwrecks: 17 June 1934
Ship	State	Description
Marguerite Emilie	France	The coaster ran aground off Concarneau, Finistère. The crew were rescued by lifeboats.
Merisaar	Estonia	The cargo ship ran aground near Pärnu. She was refloated on 21 June.

=== 19 June ===
List of shipwrecks: 19 June 1934
Ship	State	Description
Yelkenci	Turkey	The cargo ship ran aground at Mytilene, Lesbos, Greece. She was refloated on 25 June.

=== 20 June ===
List of shipwrecks: 20 June 1934
Ship	State	Description
Col di Lana	Italy	The cargo ship ran aground in the South China Sea (approximately 20°N 116°E). She was refloated on 25 June.
Dresden	Germany	The ocean liner struck a rock off Bokn, Norway. She was beached at Karmøy. Passengers were taken off by Ardent (France), Kong Harald, Kong Haakon, Kronprinsesse Märtha, Kvitsøy and Stavanger (all Norway). Of the 323 crew and 975 passengers on board, four passengers were killed in the incident. The wreck was subsequently scrapped in situ.

=== 28 June ===
List of shipwrecks: 28 June 1934
Ship	State	Description
Ryuho Maru	Japan	The cargo ship ran aground at Mokpo, Korea. She broke in two on 2 July and was a total loss.

=== 29 June ===
List of shipwrecks: 29 June 1934
Ship	State	Description
Miyuki	Imperial Japanese Navy	The Fubuki-class destroyer collided with Inazuma (Imperial Japanese Navy) and sank with the loss of at least five lives.
Water Pearl	United Kingdom	The schooner was wrecked on Bequia, Grenadines.

== July ==
=== 5 July ===
List of shipwrecks: 5 July 1934
Ship	State	Description
Shamrock	United States	The dredger caught fire at Bay City, Michigan. She was a total loss.

=== 6 July ===
List of shipwrecks: 6 July 1934
Ship	State	Description
Witch	United Kingdom	The coal hulk was struck at Portland, Dorset by a practice torpedo and sank. She was later refloated and returned to service.

=== 9 July ===
List of shipwrecks: 9 July 1934
Ship	State	Description
Electro	United Kingdom	The schooner was abandoned off the Magdalen Islands, Ontario, Canada.
Ville de Papeete	France	The coaster ran aground on Haraiki, French Polynesia and was a total loss. All on board were rescued.

=== 12 July ===
List of shipwrecks: 12 July 1934
Ship	State	Description
Rosabelle	United Kingdom	The coaster struck The Manacles, off the coast of Cornwall and sank. All crew survived. She was refloated on 16 July and beached at Coverack Bay. She was subsequently towed into Falmouth.

=== 13 July ===
List of shipwrecks: 13 July 1934
Ship	State	Description
af Chapman	Marinen	The barquentine ran aground at Port Aleza, Puerto Rico.
Scot	United Kingdom	The Thames barge was rammed and sunk at Harwich, Essex by England (United Kingdom). The crew were rescued.

=== 15 July ===
List of shipwrecks: 15 July 1934
Ship	State	Description
Bernice	United States	The 15-gross register ton, 44.3-foot (13.5 m) fishing vessel was destroyed by fire at the Koggiung Cannery Dock on the Kvichak River on the Bristol Bay coast of the Territory of Alaska. Her crew of three survived.

=== 17 July ===
List of shipwrecks: 17 July 1934
Ship	State	Description
Hellas	Greece	The cargo ship ran aground at Laurium. She was refloated on 23 July.

=== 20 July ===
List of shipwrecks: 20 July 1934
Ship	State	Description
Autocrat	United Kingdom	The tug capsized and sank in the River Humber whilst assisting with the refloating of Ouse (United Kingdom). All six crew were rescued by Salvage (United Kingdom), which later refloated Ouse.

=== 23 July ===
List of shipwrecks: 23 July 1934
Ship	State	Description
Chi Chuen	China	The cargo ship struck rocks in the Yangtze upstream of Ichang and was beached. She was refloated on 27 July. She was subsequently declared a total loss.
Monte Rosa	Germany	The ocean liner ran aground off Thorshavn, Faroe Islands. She was refloated the next day.

=== 24 July ===
List of shipwrecks: 24 July 1934
Ship	State	Description
Astrid	United Kingdom	The schooner suffered an onboard explosion in the Atlantic Ocean (45°09′N 59°15′W) and sank. Five crew were rescued by Alssund (Denmark).

=== 25 July ===
List of shipwrecks: 25 July 1934
Ship	State	Description
Charlotte Cords	Germany	The cargo ship collided with the cargo ship Pear Branch (United Kingdom) in the North Sea off Grimsby, Lincolnshire, England, United Kingdom.
Defiance	United States	The 27-gross register ton, 47.2-foot (14.4 m) fishing vessel sank off Anchor Point, Territory of Alaska. Her crew of three survived.

=== 26 July ===
List of shipwrecks: 26 July 1934
Ship	State	Description
Atenas	United States	The cargo ship caught fire and sank at New York. She was refloated on 29 July.
Marion Gladys	United Kingdom	The schooner was driven ashore at Indian Tickle, Labrador, Canada and was wrecked.

=== 28 July ===
List of shipwrecks: 28 July 1934
Ship	State	Description
Winton	United Kingdom	The cargo ship ran aground in Table Bay, South Africa, on a voyage from Thevenard, South Australia to United Kingdom/Continent ports with wheat. She later broke her back and was consequently declared a total loss.

=== 31 July ===
List of shipwrecks: 31 July 1934
Ship	State	Description
Ruy Barbosa	Brazil	The cargo liner ran aground at Leixões, Portugal and was wrecked. All on board survived.

== August ==
=== 1 August ===
List of shipwrecks: 1 August 1934
Ship	State	Description
Indauchu	Spain	The cargo ship ran aground at Workington, Cumberland. She was refloated on 10 August.

=== 8 August ===
List of shipwrecks: 8 August 1934
Ship	State	Description
Dardanella	United States	The 19-gross register ton motor vessel was wrecked at Barlow Point (58°22′45″N 134°53′30″W) in Stephens Passage in the Alexander Archipelago in Southeast Alaska. The three people aboard abandoned ship in a small boat and survived.

=== 9 August ===
List of shipwrecks: 9 August 1934
Ship	State	Description
Bluebell	United Kingdom	The Bluebell Collision: The ferry collided with Waraneen (United Kingdom) in the Hunter River at Newcastle, New South Wales, Australia and sank with the loss of three lives.

=== 13 August ===
List of shipwrecks: 13 August 1934
Ship	State	Description
Hilda	Portugal	The sailing ship ran aground at Aveiro and was wrecked.
Monsunen	Denmark	The auxiliary sailing ship was wrecked off the Samoan Islands. All crew survived.
St. Tudwal	United Kingdom	The coaster sank 4 nautical miles (7.4 km) south west by west of Texa, Inner Hebrides.

=== 14 August ===
List of shipwrecks: 14 August 1934
Ship	State	Description
USS PE-6	United States Navy	The decommissioned Eagle-class patrol craft was sunk as a target.
USS PE-7	United States Navy	The decommissioned Eagle-class patrol craft was sunk as a target.

=== 15 August ===
List of shipwrecks: 15 August 1934
Ship	State	Description
Nell Gwyn	United Kingdom	The Thames Barge sprang a leak and sank in the River Thames.

=== 20 August ===
List of shipwrecks: 20 August 1934
Ship	State	Description
Boris Sheboldaiev	Soviet Union	The tanker ran aground on the Camelle Rocks, 6 nautical miles (11 km) east of Cape Vilano, Galicia, Spain. She broke in two and was a total loss.
Whiteway	Canada	The schooner was driven ashore on Seal Island, Nova Scotia.

=== 22 August ===
List of shipwrecks: 22 August 1934
Ship	State	Description
George Watts	United Kingdom	The coaster was driven ashore and wrecked at Kribi, Cameroon.
Mona	Czechoslovakia	Collided with Berezina (Soviet Union) in the Kiel Canal, Germany and was damaged. Laid up pending sale which took place in 1935.

=== 25 August ===
List of shipwrecks: 25 August 1934
Ship	State	Description
Whiteway	United Kingdom	The auxiliary three-masted schooner was wrecked at Blackrock Devils Limb, Seal Island, Nova Scotia, Canada.

=== 26 August ===
List of shipwrecks: 26 August 1934
Ship	State	Description
Midland City	United Kingdom	The cargo ship struck a reef in Georgian Bay and was beached. She was repaired and returned to service.

=== 27 August ===
List of shipwrecks: 27 August 1934
Ship	State	Description
Duchess of Devonshire	United Kingdom	The paddle steamer ran aground at Sidmouth, Devon. All passengers were taken off, but the crew remained on board.

=== 28 August ===
List of shipwrecks: 28 August 1934
Ship	State	Description
Flora	Spain	The cargo ship ran aground on Cape St. Vincent, Portugal. She was refloated but subsequently sank. All crew were rescued.

== September ==
=== 2 September ===
List of shipwrecks: 2 September 1934
Ship	State	Description
Tabor	Norway	The auxiliary schooner came ashore on Rønne, Denmark and was wrecked.

=== 3 September ===
List of shipwrecks: 3 September 1934
Ship	State	Description
J. B. Stetson	United States	The coaster ran aground at Monterey, California and was wrecked. All crew were rescued.
Līva	Latvia	The coaster sank in the North Sea.

=== 4 September ===
List of shipwrecks: 4 September 1934
Ship	State	Description
Auslag	Denmark	The coaster sprang a leak and sank in the North Sea 110 nautical miles (200 km) east by north of the Humber Lightship (United Kingdom). All eight crew were rescued by Anna Dorthea (Denmark).
Gyda	United Kingdom	The cargo ship ran aground at Dingwall, Nova Scotia, Canada. She was refloated on 10 September.

=== 7 September ===
List of shipwrecks: 7 September 1934
Ship	State	Description
Aliki	Greece	The cargo ship ran aground at Rosario, Santa Fe, Brazil. She was refloated on 16 September.
Queenmoor	United Kingdom	The cargo ship ran aground at Chelsea Point, South Africa and was wrecked.

=== 8 September ===
List of shipwrecks: 8 September 1934
Ship	State	Description
Burrhard No.2	United States	The dredger sank in the Columbia River.
Morro Castle	United States	Morro Castle The cruise ship caught fire and was beached at Asbury Park, New Jersey with the loss of 135 of the 549 people on board.

=== 9 September ===
List of shipwrecks: 9 September 1934
Ship	State	Description
Stylalanos Castanos	Greece	The cargo ship ran aground on the Vest Rock, 30 nautical miles (56 km) west of Oran, Algeria. She was refloated on 16 September.

=== 10 September ===
List of shipwrecks: 10 September 1934
Ship	State	Description
Holmdene	United Kingdom	The cargo ship ran aground at Goapnuth Point, Gujarat, India. She subsequently broke in two.

=== 12 September ===
List of shipwrecks: 12 September 1934
Ship	State	Description
Schiaffino XXIV	France	The ship departed Port-Saint-Louis-du-Rhône for Algiers, Algeria. She foundered on the voyage; some wreckage washed up near the Espiguette Lighthouse, Le Grau-du-Roi, Gard on 7 April 1935.

=== 16 September ===
List of shipwrecks: 16 September 1934
Ship	State	Description
Dusken	Norway	The cargo ship capsized and sank at Danzig. She was refloated on 19 September. Dusken was not repaired, being broken up in Danzig.

=== 20 September ===
List of shipwrecks: 20 September 1934
Ship	State	Description
Marechal Foch	France	The schooner was wrecked in the Austral Islands. All crew were rescued.
Thistlebrae	United Kingdom	The cargo ship ran aground in the Paraná River. She was refloated on 26 September.

=== 21 September ===
List of shipwrecks: 21 September 1934
Ship	State	Description
Taijin Maru	Japan	The cargo ship ran aground at Omaezaki, Shizuoka. She was refloated on 30 September.

=== 24 September ===
List of shipwrecks: 24 September 1934
Ship	State	Description
Emily	United Kingdom	The ketch foundered in the Bristol Channel off Flat Holm. Both crew survived.
Ostrea	United Kingdom	The coaster sank off Flint Island, Nova Scotia, Canada.

=== 25 September ===
List of shipwrecks: 25 September 1934
Ship	State	Description
Jefferson Myers	United States	The cargo ship ran aground at Kiukiang, China. She was refloated on 1 October.

=== 27 September ===
List of shipwrecks: 27 September 1934
Ship	State	Description
Penthames	United Kingdom	The cargo ship ran aground at Cape Huertas, Spain. She was refloated on 3 October.

=== 29 September ===
List of shipwrecks: 29 September 1934
Ship	State	Description
Suiwah	China	The cargo ship caught fire and sank in the East China Sea. All crew survived.

== October ==
=== 2 October ===
List of shipwrecks: 2 October 1934
Ship	State	Description
Millpool	United Kingdom	The cargo ship foundered in the Atlantic Ocean 700 nautical miles (1,300 km) off Labrador, Canada with the loss of all 26 crew.

=== 4 October ===
List of shipwrecks: 4 October 1934
Ship	State	Description
Charles Jose	Belgium	The cargo ship capsized and sank in the North Sea 4 nautical miles (7.4 km) off the Haaks Lightship (Netherlands) with the loss of nine crew. Her captain was rescued by Wildenfels (Germany).

=== 4–5 October (overnight) ===
List of shipwrecks: Unknown date 1934
Ship	State	Description
E J N	United States	While moored in Lynn Canal in Southeast Alaska with no one aboard, the 24-gross register ton motor vessel drifted ashore and was smashed to pieces on the rocks sometime between 9:00 p.m. and 2:00 a.m. after her mooring cable broke.

=== 5 October ===
List of shipwrecks: 5 October 1934
Ship	State	Description
City of Cambridge	United Kingdom	The cargo liner ran aground on or near Pratas Island. Sixty of her 80 crew were taken off the next day by HMS Suffolk (Royal Navy). City of Cambridge was abandoned on 9 October as a total loss and the remaining twenty crew were rescued by HMS Suffolk. The wreck was looted and eventually destroyed by fire around Christmas 1933.
Stanwell	United Kingdom	The cargo ship sprang a leak in the Atlantic Ocean and was abandoned (46°34′N 7°00′W). The crew were rescued by the fishing vessel Recang (France).

=== 6 October ===
List of shipwrecks: 6 October 1934
Ship	State	Description
Fjeld	Norway	The cargo ship ran aground, she refloated and put into Lødingen, Norway where she was beached.

=== 8 October ===
List of shipwrecks: 8 October 1934
Ship	State	Description
Elise Schulte	Germany	The cargo ship ran aground on the Juister Riff in the North Sea off Bremen, Germany. She broke in two and was a total loss. The crew were rescued.

=== 9 October ===
List of shipwrecks: 9 October 1934
Ship	State	Description
Eskil	Sweden	The cargo ship collided with Sigurd I (Norway) in the Baltic Sea and was beached at Hveen. She was later refloated and taken to Landskrona, where she was repaired and returned to service.
Ruy	Portugal	The schooner foundered at Beira, Mozambique.
Saint Andrew	United States	During a voyage from Mist Harbor to Unga (55°11′00″N 160°30′10″W) on Unga Island in the Shumagin Islands off the Alaska Peninsula in the Territory of Alaska with six passengers and a crew of two on board, the 40-gross register ton, 34-foot (10 m) fishing vessel was lost in Unga Bay. Three of her passengers and both crewmen lost their lives.

=== 11 October ===
List of shipwrecks: 11 October 1934
Ship	State	Description
Valiant	United States	The tug collided with Lumberman (United States) in San Francisco Bay and sank with the loss of two crew.

=== 13 October ===
List of shipwrecks: 13 October 1934
Ship	State	Description
Eddie	United Kingdom	The coaster capsized and sank at Goole, Yorkshire. The crew survived.
Winona	United Kingdom	The auxiliary sailing ship caught fire of Newfoundland and was a total loss.

=== 15 October ===
List of shipwrecks: 15 October 1934
Ship	State	Description
Viking	Denmark	The cargo ship was abandoned in Clew Bay. She was subsequently towed to Limerick by Zwarte Zee (Netherlands).

=== 16 October ===
List of shipwrecks: 16 October 1934
Ship	State	Description
Bussard	Germany	The cargo ship was driven ashore at Kiel, Germany, in a gale. She was refloated on 22 October.

=== 18 October ===
List of shipwrecks: 18 October 1934
Ship	State	Description
Edna	United Kingdom	The sloop collided with Irwell in the River Humber at Whitton, Lincolnshire and sank.

=== 19 October ===
List of shipwrecks: 19 October 1934
Ship	State	Description
Clan Mackay	United Kingdom	The cargo ship foundered at a Sierra Leone port.

=== 21 October ===
List of shipwrecks: 21 October 1934
Ship	State	Description
Actuosity	United Kingdom	The ship was driven ashore at Colhugh Point, Glamorgan. Salvage was completed in December 1934.
Harvester	United States	The cargo ship was hit by President Madison (United States) at Seattle, Washington and sunk when President Madison broke free from her moorings in a storm. All twenty crew survived.
Virginia	United States	The passenger ship was hit by President Madison (United States) at Seattle, Washington and sunk when President Madison broke free from her moorings in a storm. Fifty passengers were rescued.

=== 23 October ===
List of shipwrecks: 23 October 1934
Ship	State	Description
Espuzito G	Italy	The cargo ship was wrecked at Capo Rizzuto. The crew were rescued.

=== 27 October ===
List of shipwrecks: 27 October 1934
Ship	State	Description
James M	United Kingdom	The coaster collided with Norna (Sweden) at Boston, Lincolnshire and sank. She was later refloated.
Sostrene	Denmark	The auxiliary schooner was abandoned west of Trelleborg, Skåne County, Sweden and came ashore there.

=== 28 October ===
List of shipwrecks: 28 October 1934
Ship	State	Description
Kongshaug	Norway	The coaster came ashore at Siglufjordur, Iceland. She was declared a total loss but was repaired and returned to service as Snœfjell.

=== 29 October ===
List of shipwrecks: 29 October 1934
Ship	State	Description
Whiteabbey	United Kingdom	The coaster ran aground at Ballyshannon, County Donegal, Ireland and was wrecked. All crew survived.

=== 30 October ===
List of shipwrecks: 30 October 1934
Ship	State	Description
Marie Lydia	United Kingdom	The auxiliary schooner was wrecked 10 nautical miles (19 km) north of Quebec City, Canada with the loss of three crew.

=== 31 October ===
List of shipwrecks: 31 October 1934
Ship	State	Description
Jupiter	Netherlands	The schooner foundered in the North Sea 60 nautical miles (110 km) east of Great Yarmouth, Norfolk, United Kingdom. The crew were rescued by a German fishing vessel.

== November ==
=== 1 November ===
List of shipwrecks: 1 November 1934
Ship	State	Description
Johanne	Germany	The auxiliary sailing vessel suffered an onboard explosion and sank in the North Sea off the Elbe 2 Lightship (Germany). The crew were rescued.

=== 2 November ===
List of shipwrecks: 2 November 1934
Ship	State	Description
Golden Sea	United Kingdom	The cargo ship ran aground in Tetjuhe Bay, Soviet Union. She was refloated on 26 December.
Tung Foo	China	The cargo ship foundered in the Yellow Sea west of Korea during a typhoon.
Yeiryo Maru	Japan	The cargo ship issued an SOS in the East China Sea (35°40′N 131°20′E). No further trace, presumed foundered with the loss of all hands.

=== 5 November ===
List of shipwrecks: 5 November 1934
Ship	State	Description
Kairouan	France	The cargo ship came ashore at Cape Juby, Morocco and was wrecked.

=== 7 November ===
List of shipwrecks: 7 November 1934
Ship	State	Description
Erik Boye	Denmark	The cargo ship collided with Edith Howaldt (Germany) in the Scheldt at Bath, Zeeland, Netherlands and was consequently beached. She was refloated the next day and towed to Antwerp, Belgium for repairs.
Schorn	United States	The 29-gross register ton, 46.2-foot (14.1 m) fishing vessel sank at Key Reef (56°09′35″N 132°49′45″W) in Clarence Strait in the Alexander Archipelago in Southeast Alaska. Her entire crew of five survived.

=== 8 November ===
List of shipwrecks: 8 November 1934
Ship	State	Description
Ranan Maru	Japan	The cargo ship caught fire in the Sea of Japan and sank with the loss of all hands.

=== 9 November ===
List of shipwrecks: 9 November 1934
Ship	State	Description
Caliche	United States	The tanker exploded and caught fire in the Mobile Channel at Mobile, Alabama. She was abandoned by her crew.
Liguria	Sweden	The cargo ship ran aground at Ilhéus, Bahia, Brazil. She was refloated on 16 November.

=== 14 November ===
List of shipwrecks: 14 November 1934
Ship	State	Description
Marionga J. Goulandri	Greece	The cargo ship ran aground at Necochea, Argentina. She broke her back and was a total loss.
Seven Seas Trader	United Kingdom	The cargo ship ran aground on Long Island, New York, United States. She was declared a total loss on 19 November. All crew were rescued.

=== 17 November ===
List of shipwrecks: 17 November 1934
Ship	State	Description
Clara Paolino	Italy	The cargo ship ran aground at Sainte-Maxime, Var, France and broke up. The crew were rescued.

=== 18 November ===
List of shipwrecks: 18 November 1934
Ship	State	Description
Helouan	Greece	The cargo ship ran aground at Cape Aliki, Imbros, Turkey. She was refloated on 24 November.

=== 19 November ===
List of shipwrecks: 19 November 1934
Ship	State	Description
USS PE-40	United States Navy	The decommissioned Eagle-class patrol craft was sunk as a target.

=== 20 November ===
List of shipwrecks: 20 November 1934
Ship	State	Description
Christel Vinnen	Germany	The cargo ship ran aground south east of Lagos, Nigeria. She was refloated on 25 November.
Sumatra	United Kingdom	The coaster sank at Hong Kong whilst under repair.

=== 21 November ===
List of shipwrecks: 21 November 1934
Ship	State	Description
W. C. Franz	Canada	The motor bulk carrier collided with the cargo ship Edward E. Loomis (United States) in Lake Huron and sank in 230 feet (70 m) of water 30 nautical miles (35 mi; 56 km) southeast of Thunder Bay Island at 44.647917°N 82.906533°W with the loss of four members of her crew.

=== 22 November ===
List of shipwrecks: 22 November 1934
Ship	State	Description
Nonpareil	United Kingdom	The Thames barge was hit by Auk (United Kingdom) in the River Thames at Woolwich and sank. All three crew were rescued.
USS PE-14	United States Navy	The decommissioned Eagle-class patrol craft was sunk as a target.

=== 23 November ===
List of shipwrecks: 23 November 1934
Ship	State	Description
Aeolos	Greece	The cargo ship ran aground on the Zindjir-Bozan Bank. She was refloated on 7 December.
Euthalia	Greece	The cargo ship ran aground in the River Humber at Sunk Island, Yorkshire, United Kingdom. She was refloated on 3 December.
Iron Monarch	United Kingdom	The cargo ship ran aground at Newcastle, New South Wales, Australia. She was refloated on 3 December.
Magna	Sweden	The cargo ship ran aground at Limerick, Ireland. She was refloated on 4 December.

=== 24 November ===
List of shipwrecks: 24 November 1934
Ship	State	Description
Rosemount	Canada	The cargo ship sank at Montreal, Quebec, Canada. She was refloated on 16 December but sank again later that day and salvage operations were suspended. She was refloated again on 15 May 1935 but declared a constructive total loss and sold for use as a grain hulk.
Sovinto	Finland	The three-masted schooner was dismasted in the Baltic Sea in a gale. She came ashore on Hiiumaa, Estonia and was wrecked.

=== 27 November ===
List of shipwrecks: 27 November 1934
Ship	State	Description
Frithjof Eide	Norway	The cargo ship ran aground at Prestogalten, Nord-Trøndelag, Norway and was abandoned.
Lolita A	Spain	The cargo ship ran aground at Vieux-Boucau-les-Bains, Landes, France and was abandoned. She broke in two and was a total loss.

=== 29 November ===
List of shipwrecks: 29 November 1934
Ship	State	Description
Kosti	Greece	The cargo ship ran aground at Ochakiv, Soviet Union. She was refloated on 8 December.
Maroula	Greece	The cargo ship ran aground 2 nautical miles (3.7 km) east of Necochea, Argentina. She broke in two and was a total loss.

=== 30 November ===
List of shipwrecks: 30 November 1934
Ship	State	Description
Henry Cort	United States	The whaleback steamer was wrecked on the breakwater at Muskegon, Michigan. Her crew was rescued by the United States Coast Guard, but one Coast Guardsman died. She broke in two in December and was scrapped in 1935.

=== Unknown date ===
List of shipwrecks: Unknown date 1934
Ship	State	Description
Popi	Greece	The passenger ship ran aground at Fleves Islet, Saronic Gulf on or before 28 November. She was later refloated and towed to Piraeus.

== December ==
=== 1 December ===
List of shipwrecks: 1 December 1934
Ship	State	Description
Henry Cort	United States	The cargo ship came ashore at Muskegon, Michigan in a gale and was a total loss. All crew were saved.
Kong Magnus	Norway	The cargo ship ran aground in the Ullsfjorden, Norway. She was refloated on 7 December.
Sea King	United States	The tug sank at Galveston, Texas.

=== 2 December ===
List of shipwrecks: 2 December 1934
Ship	State	Description
Coramba	United Kingdom	The coaster foundered off Westernport, Victoria, Australia with the loss of all seventeen crew.

=== 3 December ===
List of shipwrecks: 3 December 1934
Ship	State	Description
Frida Peters	Germany	The cargo ship ran aground at Asnæs, Zealand, Denmark. She was refloated on 7 December.

=== 4 December ===
List of shipwrecks: 4 December 1934
Ship	State	Description
Walter Kennedy	United Kingdom	The cargo ship sprang a leak and sank in the Atlantic Ocean east of Miquelon. The crew survived.

=== 5 December ===
List of shipwrecks: 5 December 1934
Ship	State	Description
Dunscore	United Kingdom	The coaster sank in the North Sea 5 nautical miles (9.3 km) east north east of St Abb's Head, Berwickshire. All six crew were rescued by the St Abb's Lifeboat.

=== 8 December ===
List of shipwrecks: 8 December 1934
Ship	State	Description
Wilhelm Tham	Sweden	The cargo ship ran aground off Trosa, Södermanland County and sank. The crew were rescued.

=== 9 December ===
List of shipwrecks: 9 December 1934
Ship	State	Description
Falksten	Sweden	The cargo ship ran aground on Hiiumaa, Estonia. She was refloated on 16 December.
Glen Head	United Kingdom	The cargo ship ran aground on Bornholm, Denmark. She was declared a total loss on 17 December.
Thielbek	Germany	The cargo ship ran aground at Befanaes, Denmark. She was later refloated and returned to service.

=== 10 December ===
List of shipwrecks: 10 December 1934
Ship	State	Description
Arcadia	Italy	The cargo ship ran aground on the Almadi Reef off Dakar, French West Africa. The wreck was sold on 1 January 1935 for scrapping.
HSwMS Klas Uggla	Swedish Navy	The destroyer ran aground at Malmö. She was refloated on 15 December. Subsequently repaired and returned to service.
Oxbird	United Kingdom	The coaster collided with Dagmar (Denmark) in the Thames Estuary and sank. All seven crew were rescued by Dagmar. She was raised on 12 December and beached on the Yantlet Flats, Kent.

=== 11 December ===
List of shipwrecks: 11 December 1934
Ship	State	Description
Osprey	United Kingdom	The salvage tug fouled the wreck of Eddie (United Kingdom) and sank at Goole, Yorkshire whilst assisting with the salvage of Eddie.

=== 13 December ===
List of shipwrecks: 13 December 1934
Ship	State	Description
Cushendun	United Kingdom	The coaster ran aground at Mostyn, Flintshire. She was refloated on 19 December.

=== 14 December ===
List of shipwrecks: 14 December 1934
Ship	State	Description
Usworth	United Kingdom	The cargo ship sank in the Atlantic Ocean. The crew were rescued by Jean Jadot (Belgium).

=== 17 December ===
List of shipwrecks: 17 December 1934
Ship	State	Description
Hachilah	United Kingdom	The motor schooner caught fire and sank in Campbeltown Loch.
Hervar	Norway	The cargo ship collided with Tung Tuck (China) at Whangpo, China and sank.

=== 18 December ===
List of shipwrecks: 18 December 1934
Ship	State	Description
Vinga	Sweden	The schooner came ashore on Öland. The crew were rescued.

=== 19 December ===
List of shipwrecks: 19 December 1934
Ship	State	Description
Ann Stathatos	Greece	The cargo ship ran aground on Hainan Island, China. She was refloated on 22 December.
Orania	Netherlands	The ocean liner was rammed and sunk at Leixões, Portugal by Loanda (Portugal). The crew and all 122 passengers were rescued.
Sisto	Norway	The cargo ship was abandoned in the Atlantic Ocean. All sixteen crew were rescued by New York (Weimar Republic). Sisto was taken in tow by Zwarte Zee (Netherlands) on 2 January 1937 but subsequently capsized and sank (51°25′N 11°32′W) on 3 January.

=== 24 December ===
List of shipwrecks: 24 December 1934
Ship	State	Description
Jean Smith	United Kingdom	The schooner was abandoned off Codroy, Newfoundland.

=== 31 December ===
List of shipwrecks: 31 December 1934
Ship	State	Description
Alstern	Sweden	The cargo ship ran aground at Nidingarna. She was refloated on 3 January 1935.

=== Unknown date ===
List of shipwrecks: Unknown date 1934
Ship	State	Description
Schiaffino 24	France	The cargo ship sank in the Mediterranean Sea or Strait of Gibraltar on or before 13 December.

== Unknown date ==
List of shipwrecks: Unknown date 1934
Ship	State	Description
Adriatic	United States	Partially dismantled and abandoned in 1927 and since tied up at an abandoned pier at Sturgeon Bay, Wisconsin, and used as fishing site, the 202-foot (62 m), 915.67-gross register ton self-unloading schooner barge burned and sank. Her wreckage lies in Sturgeon Bay only 6 feet (1.8 m) from shore in 2 to 15 feet (0.6 to 4.6 m) of water.
Arnold Liebes	United States	The motor vessel was wrecked at Point Barrow on the north coast of the Territory of Alaska and became a total loss.
C. B. Brower	United States	The vessel was wrecked in the Arctic Ocean off Point Barrow on the north coast of the Territory of Alaska.
City of Taunton	United States	The 292-foot (89 m) cargo ship, a sidewheel paddle steamer, was beached and abandoned at Somerset, Massachusetts, on the west bank of the Taunton River at 41°42′39″N 071°10′33″W, just south of the future site of the Charles M. Braga Jr. Memorial Bridge, sometime during the 1930s. The wreck settled on the river bottom in very shallow water.
F. C. Pendleton	United States	The 145-foot (44 m), 408-gross register ton three-masted schooner burned and sank without loss of life in up to 45 feet (14 m) of water at 44°19′38″N 068°54′27″W while at anchor in Seal Harbor at Islesboro, Maine, sometime during the 1930s.
Gardner G. Deering	United States	The 251-foot (77 m), 1,982-gross register ton five-masted schooner was abandoned and later burned in Smith Cove off West Brooksville, Maine, sometime during the 1930s. Her wreck settled in 10 to 30 feet (3.0 to 9.1 m) of water approximately 500 feet (150 m) off the north shore of the cove at 44°22′55″N 068°46′30″W.
Herefordshire	United Kingdom	The ship was driven ashore and wrecked on Cardigan Island, Cardiganshire.
M-8	Soviet Navy	The Malyutka-class submarine sank in Ussuri Bay whilst under tow. Her crew survived. She was refloated two days later, repaired and returned to service.
Patria	France	The ocean liner grounded on a bank while entering Alexandria Port in Egypt.
T-1028	United States	The fishing vessel and her sole occupant disappeared during a voyage in the Territory of Alaska from Stikine to Wrangell. Her wreckage and the remains of the only person aboard were discovered on the beach between Sitkagi Bluffs and the Yana River near Yakutat, Alaska, on 2 June 1940.
