= SS Orania (1922) =

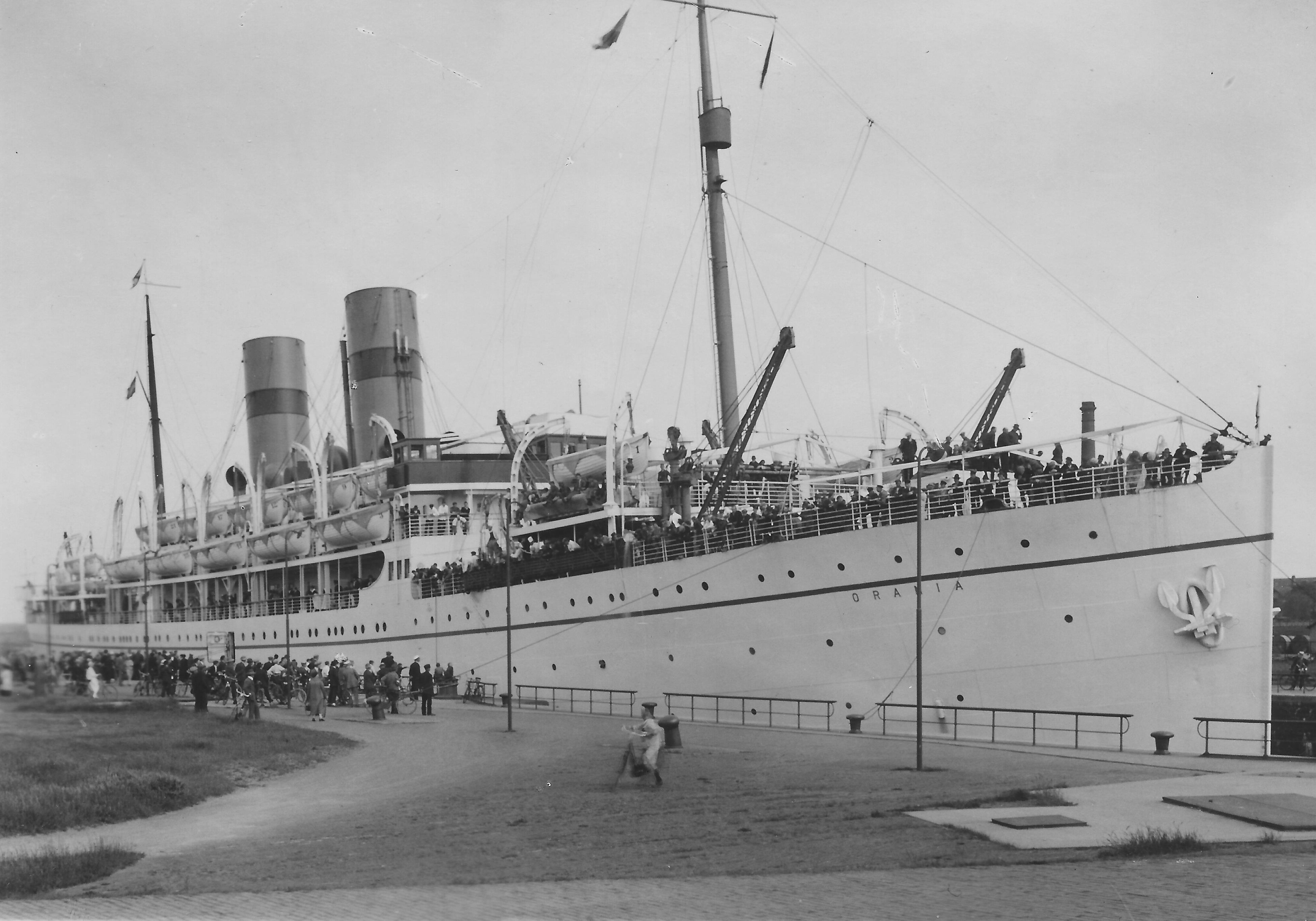
- SS Orania

History
- Name: Orania
- Owner: Koninklijke Hollandsche Lloyd
- Port of registry: Amsterdam, Netherlands
- Builder: Workman, Clark and Company
- Yard number: 379
- Launched: 21 October 1921
- Completed: 23 February 1922
- Acquired: 23 February 1922
- Maiden voyage: 15 March 1922
- In service: 15 March 1922
- Out of service: 19 December 1934
- Identification: Call sign: PGOB
- Fate: Sank in a collision with Loanda on 19 December 1934

General characteristics
- Type: Passenger ship
- Tonnage: 9,763 GRT
- Length: 137.24 metres (450 ft 3 in)
- Beam: 18.10 metres (59 ft 5 in)
- Depth: 12.42 metres (40 ft 9 in)
- Decks: 4
- Installed power: Four steam turbines
- Propulsion: Two screws
- Sail plan: Amsterdam - Buenos Aires
- Speed: 15 knots
- Capacity: Accommodation for 128 First class, 104 Second class & 878 Third Class passengers
- Crew: 250
- Notes: Two masts and two funnels

SS Orania was a Dutch Passenger ship that sank in a collision with Loanda in Leixões, Portugal on 19 December 1934 while she was travelling from Amsterdam, Netherlands to Buenos Aires, Argentina.

== Construction ==
Orania was built at the Workman, Clark and Company shipyard in Belfast, United Kingdom and launched on 21 October 1921 before being completed on 23 February 1922. The ship was 137.24 metres (450 ft 3 in) long, had a beam of 18.10 metres (59 ft 5 in) and a depth of 12.42 metres (40 ft 9 in). She was assessed at 9,763 GRT and had four steam turbines driving two screw propellers. The ship could reach a speed of 15 knots and had accommodation for 128 First class, 100 Second class & 878 Third Class passengers. She had two sisterships: Flandria and Zeelandia.

== Early career ==
Orania sailed on her maiden voyage from Amsterdam, Netherlands to Buenos Aires, Argentina on 15 March 1922. She would go on to sail this route throughout her career and was mainly used in the emigration of Eastern Europeans to South America, but also had refrigeration units which could transport many tropical foods from South America to Europe.

== Sinking ==
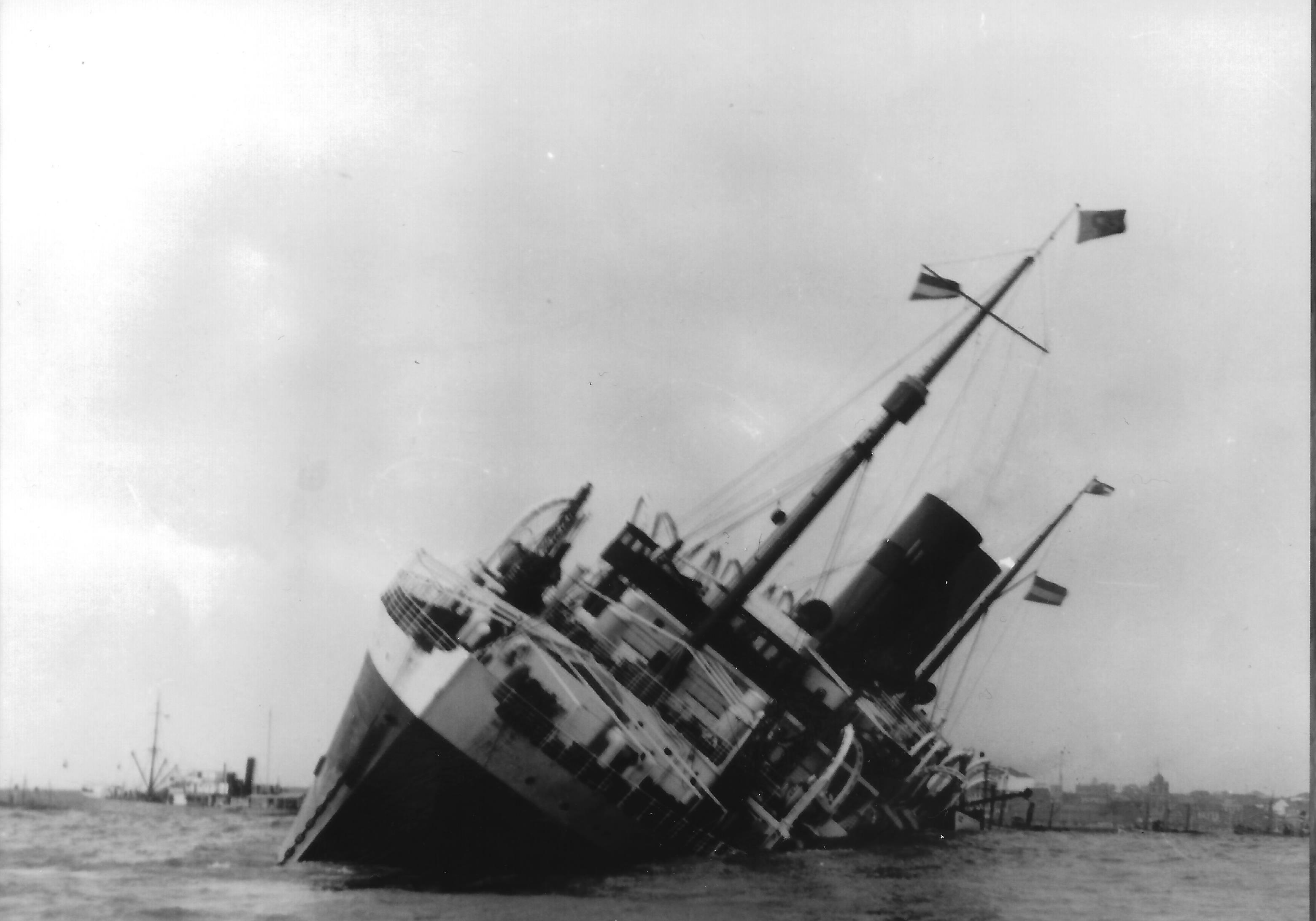
SS Orania capsizing after being rammed by SS Loanda on 19 December 1934.

Orania was on a routine voyage from Amsterdam, Netherlands to Buenos Aires, Argentina while carrying 121 passengers and 158 crew, when she lay at anchor in Leixões, Portugal to disembark passengers on 19 December 1934. While passengers were disembarking Orania at 1.30 pm, the Portuguese cargo ship Loanda steamed into the harbour at full speed without authorization and could not avoid a collision with Orania. Loanda struck Orania amidships on her port side and the collision was caught in a series of pictures. The damage to Orania extended from her promenade deck down to the waterline and the ship quickly took on water, causing the ship to list over to port. All passengers and crew on Orania were successfully evacuated before the ship capsized and sank about 50 minutes after the collision.

== Wreck ==
The wreck of Orania was declared a total loss and the British firm Cox & Danks Shipbreaking Co. were able to scrap the wreck in situ by the end of 1936.
