= Porto Leixões Cruise Terminal =

Passenger ship terminal in Porto, Portugal

Porto Cruise Terminal
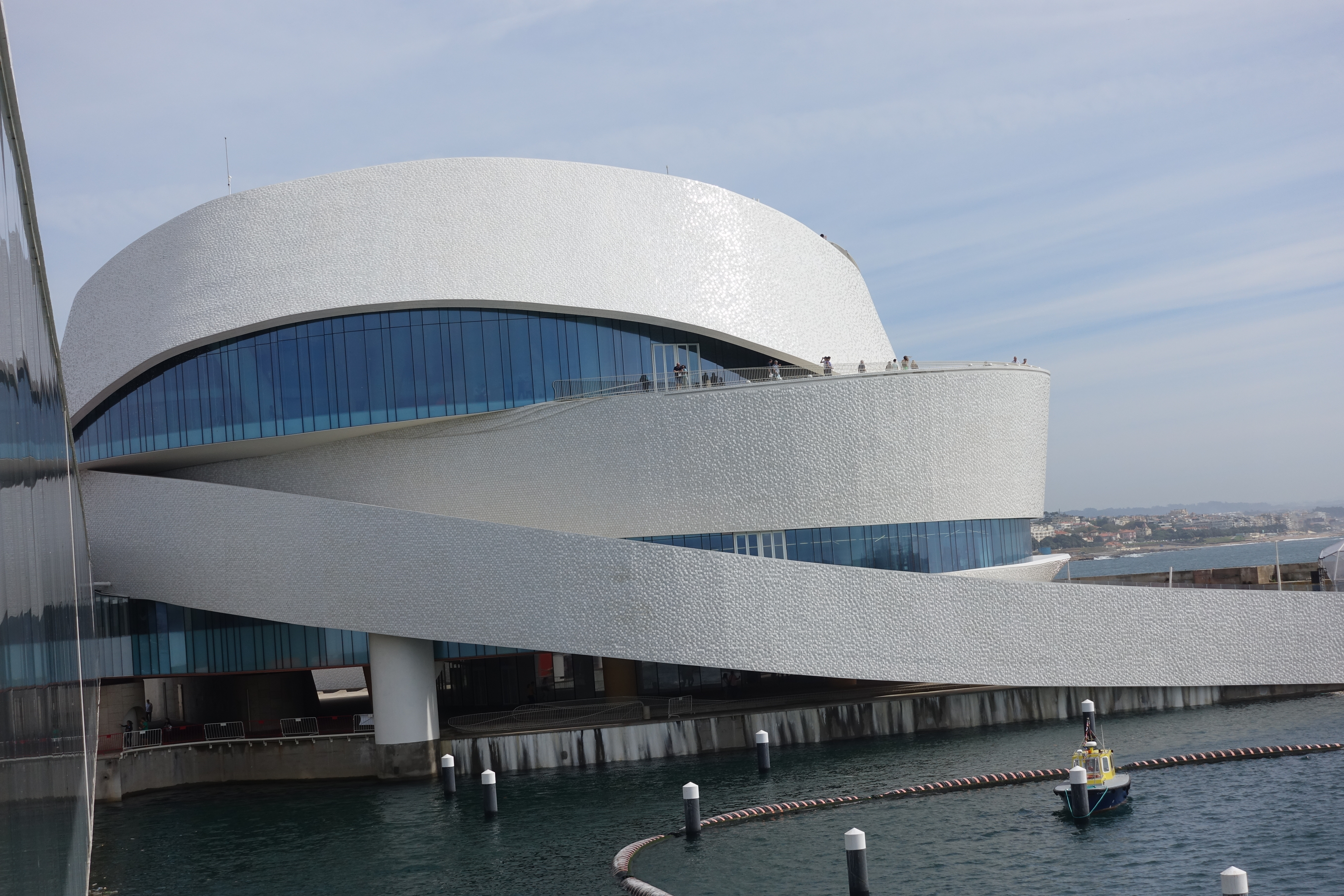
- Interactive map of the Porto Cruise Terminal area

General information
- Status: Completed
- Location: Port of Leixões, Matosinhos, Portugal
- Coordinates: 41°10′37.8″N 8°42′7.5″W
- Opened: 2015-04
- Inaugurated: 2015-06-23
- Cost: 50 million Euros
- Owner: Port of Leixões (APDL)

Design and construction
- Architect: Luís Pedro Silva
- Structural engineer: Newton Engineering Consultants
- Main contractor: Ferreira Build Power

Website
- http://www.apdl.pt/header

Porto Leixões Cruise Terminal is a passenger ship facility in the Port of Leixões, Matosinhos, Portugal. Opened in 2015 and managed by the Administração dos Portos do Douro, Leixões e Viana do Castelo (APDL), it expanded the port’s capacity to handle larger cruise vessels. The terminal building also houses the Interdisciplinary Centre for Marine and Environmental Research (CIIMAR) of the University of Porto. In 2024, the port welcomed approximately 195,877 cruise passengers.

== History ==
The cruise terminal was officially inaugurated on 23 July 2015, following a delay from the originally planned opening on 20 May. The facility began partial operations in April 2015, receiving its first passenger ships at that time. The investment in the terminal exceeded €50 million.

== Facilities ==
The terminal spans more than 19,000 square metres (200,000 sq ft) and includes a passenger station equipped with facilities for transit passengers as well as those embarking and disembarking. It can accommodate up to 2,500 passengers in turnaround operations. The quay is a 340 metres (1,120 ft) long, has a depth of 10 metres (33 ft) and can berth ships up to 300 metres (980 ft) in length, with no stay limits. The port operates under ISPS certification and requires mandatory piloting for entry and exit. The new infrastructure complemented a pre-existing cruise quay on Dock 1 North and increased the Port of Leixões' capacity to accommodate larger ships.

The main terminal building houses the Interdisciplinary Centre for Marine and Environmental Research (CIIMAR) of the University of Porto. It includes the Production and Science offices, experimental laboratories, and Scientific Outreach Departments, accommodating around 200 researchers.

The terminal features parking facilities for buses and vehicles both along the pier and within the terminal area, improving accessibility for passengers and visitors.

== Design ==
The Porto Leixões Cruise Terminal was designed by Portuguese architect Luís Pedro Silva, while the structural design was developed by Newton Engineering Consultants and the construction was handled by Ferreira Build Power. Construction required over 18,000 cubic metres (640,000 cu ft) of concrete, nearly 4,000 tonnes of steel reinforcement, and excavation of close to 6,000 cubic metres (210,000 cu ft) of earth.

The terminal’s structure incorporates thin concrete walls with double curvature that wind around the building and connect the three piers. These walls vary in height between 6 metres (20 ft) and 14 metres (46 ft) and can span more than 40 metres (130 ft). The building is about 30 metres (98 ft) tall, with a basement and four upper floors supported by concrete staircases, elevator shafts, and large-diameter slanted columns.

Its location on the southern breakwater, approximately 800 metres (2,600 ft) offshore, required measures to address marine conditions. Self-compacting concrete was used to improve durability, and foundations consist of large-diameter piles with lost steel formwork, installed using drilling techniques adapted to the local bedrock.

== Awards ==
In 2016, the Porto Leixões Cruise Terminal, designed by Luís Pedro Silva, received the international AZ Award in the Architecture – Commercial or Institutional Buildings over 1,000 square metres (11,000 sq ft) category. The project was selected from a shortlist of 66 works and won both the jury and public vote, competing against entries from more than 50 countries. The terminal was also named one of the three best cruise ports worldwide at the 2015 Seatrade Awards and received the 2015 SIL Real Estate Award for best development in commerce, services, and logistics.
