= SS Zealandia =

SS Zealandia was the name of the following two steamships:

- SS Zealandia (1875), an American sail-steamer wrecked off Southport, England in 1917.
- SS Zealandia (1910), an Australian refrigerated cargo ship sunk by Japanese bombing at Darwin on 19 February 1942.
