= Leixões =

Portuguese seaport

Coordinates: 41.183°N 8.700°W

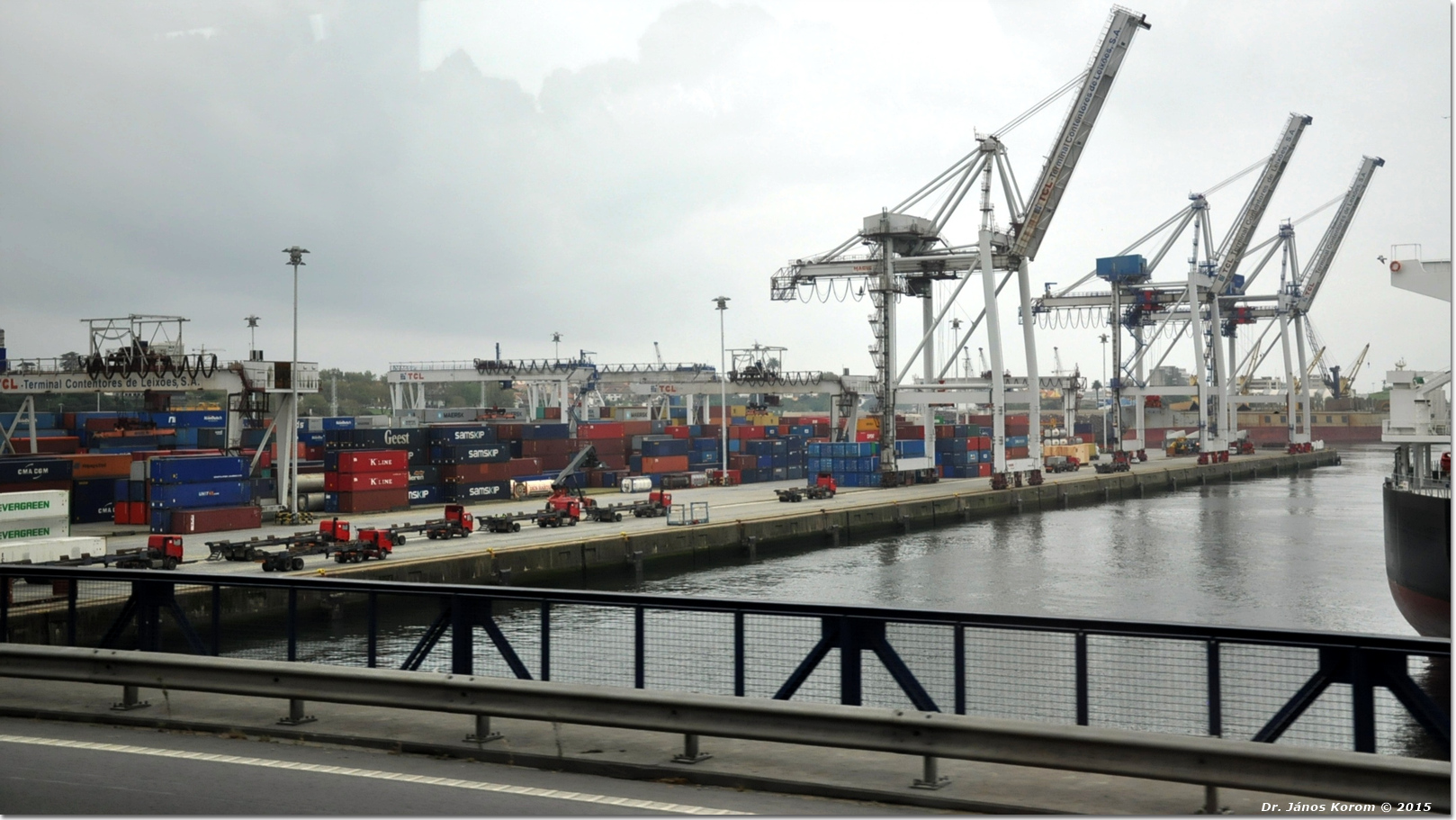
- Interactive map of Leixões

Location
- Country: Portugal
- Location: Matosinhos
- UN/LOCODE: PTLEI

Details
- Opened: 1886
- Operated by: APDL
- Owned by: Portuguese state
- Type of harbour: coastal breakwater

Statistics
- Vessel arrivals: 2,343 (2024)
- Annual cargo tonnage: 14,381,793 tonnes (2024)
- Annual container volume: 715,061 TEU (2024)
- Passenger traffic: 195,877 (2024)
- Website www.leixoes.apdl.pt/

The Port of Leixões (Portuguese: Porto de Leixões, pronounced [lɐjˈʃõjʃ]) is one of Portugal's largest seaports and the primary maritime gateway for the Northern Region. Located in Matosinhos, just north of Porto and approximately 5 kilometres (3.1 mi) from the Douro River mouth, the port handles diverse cargoes including containers, bulk cargoes, breakbulk and ro-ro, as well as serving cruise ships and fishing vessels. It is connected to Portugal's national railway network by the Leixões line.

Construction started in 1884 and the port started operating in 1886, providing a safer and more reliable alternative to the hazardous Douro River bar, which had long posed risks to shipping. Since then, Leixões has undergone multiple expansions and modernization efforts throughout the 20th and 21st centuries to accommodate larger vessels and growing trade volumes. A major upgrade project started in 2023 aims to deepen the access channel and extend the north breakwater to enhance capacity and operational efficiency.

In recent years, the port has faced a decline in cargo throughput, dropping from 19.5 million tonnes in 2019 to 14.4 million tonnes in 2024. The port authority attributes this decrease largely to the 2021 closure of the nearby Petrogal refinery, which caused a significant reduction in liquid bulk traffic.

== History ==
=== Toponym and early history ===
The name “Leixões” refers to the high, isolated rock formations off the coast near Matosinhos. These rocks, forming a natural barrier near the mouth of the Douro River, played a key role in early maritime navigation and port planning. Their significance was noted in early cartography: Lucas Waghenaer’s 1583 map of the Portuguese coast highlights the Douro estuary and shows Matosinhos bay with prominently exaggerated “leixões” rocks. Later, around 1621, royal cartographer Pedro Teixeira Albernaz recognized their strategic value as a natural fortification sheltering the nearby Leça river mouth against storms and pirates. In 1775, naval pilot José Gomes da Cruz mapped the area and proposed using the largest rock as a fortress foundation, also suggesting filling the gaps between the rocks on the north side to create a safer harbour.

=== Planning and constructing of the harbour ===
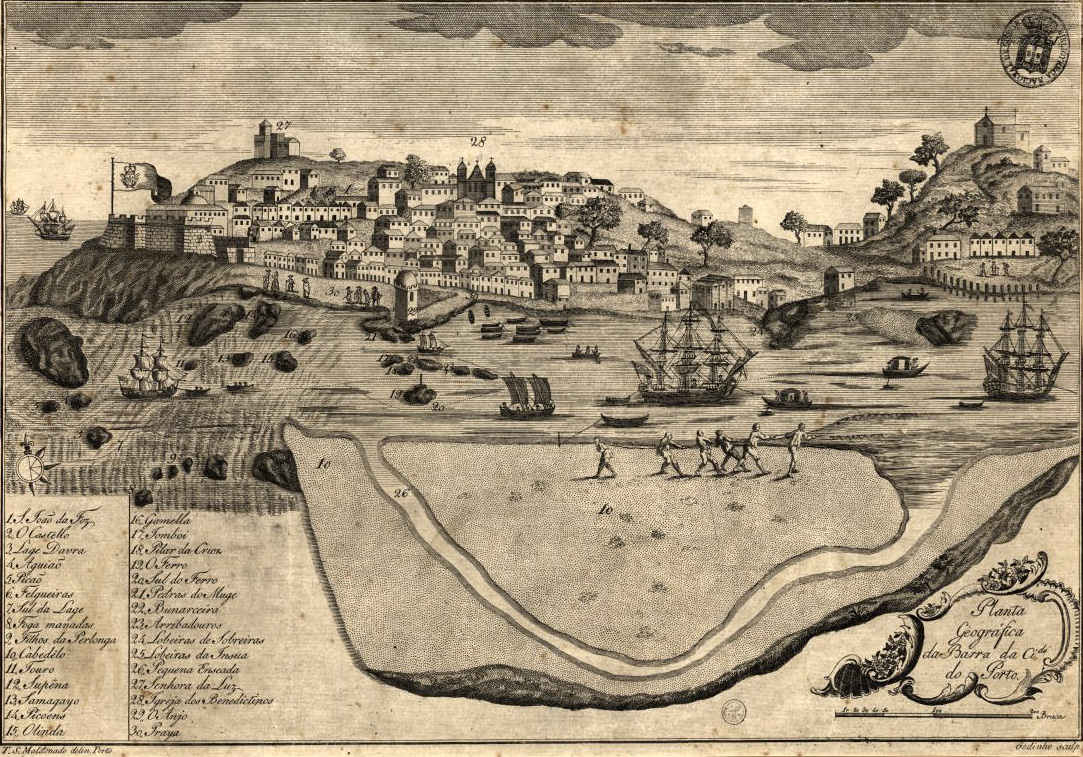
Mouth of Douro depicted in 1789

The origins of the modern Port of Leixões are closely linked to the longstanding navigation hazards at the mouth of the Douro River, which served as Porto’s principal harbour until the late 19th century. The Douro's entrance was notoriously dangerous, due to a shifting sandbank, strong surf and a narrow, rock-strewn channel that produced frequent shipwrecks. By the late 18th century, the increasing size of ships and the intensifying maritime traffic exposed the growing impracticality of the Douro bar, threatening Porto's vital economic and social fabric. Although engineers had proposed interventions since the late 18th century, those measures remained piecemeal and the entry continued to cause serious losses.

A turning point came with the sinking of the steamship Porto on 29 March 1852, which prompted a national outcry and led the government to establish commissions to investigate and propose remedial works. These commissions solicited proposals from both foreign and Portuguese engineers, many of whom considered the construction of an artificial harbour north of the Douro estuary as a safer alternative. In 1864, the government appointed engineer Manuel Afonso de Espregueira to examine both the Douro bar and the feasibility of a new port at Leixões or nearby. Espregueira argued that even with potential improvements to the Douro bar, a deep-water port of refuge was essential to shelter vessels awaiting safe entry.

Even before construction began, the idea of Leixões as a fully equipped commercial port was controversial. Some feared it would draw maritime trade away from Porto's traditional river harbour and diminish the city's role as a commercial centre. Nevertheless, the Ministry's technical commission concluded that no works could give the Douro's bar the accessibility and safety required for first-class navigation, and that Leixões was therefore the necessary complement to the city's port system.

From the 1860s onwards, several proposals for an artificial harbour at Leixões were put forward, diverging mainly on the number and size of entrances and their connections to Porto. The definitive design, produced in 1883 by Afonso Joaquim Nogueira Soares and based in part on a plan by John Coode, envisaged Leixões as both a refuge and commercial port, with rail links to the city. The project was authorised by law on 26 July 1883, and in February 1884 construction was awarded to the French firm Dauderni & Duparchy.

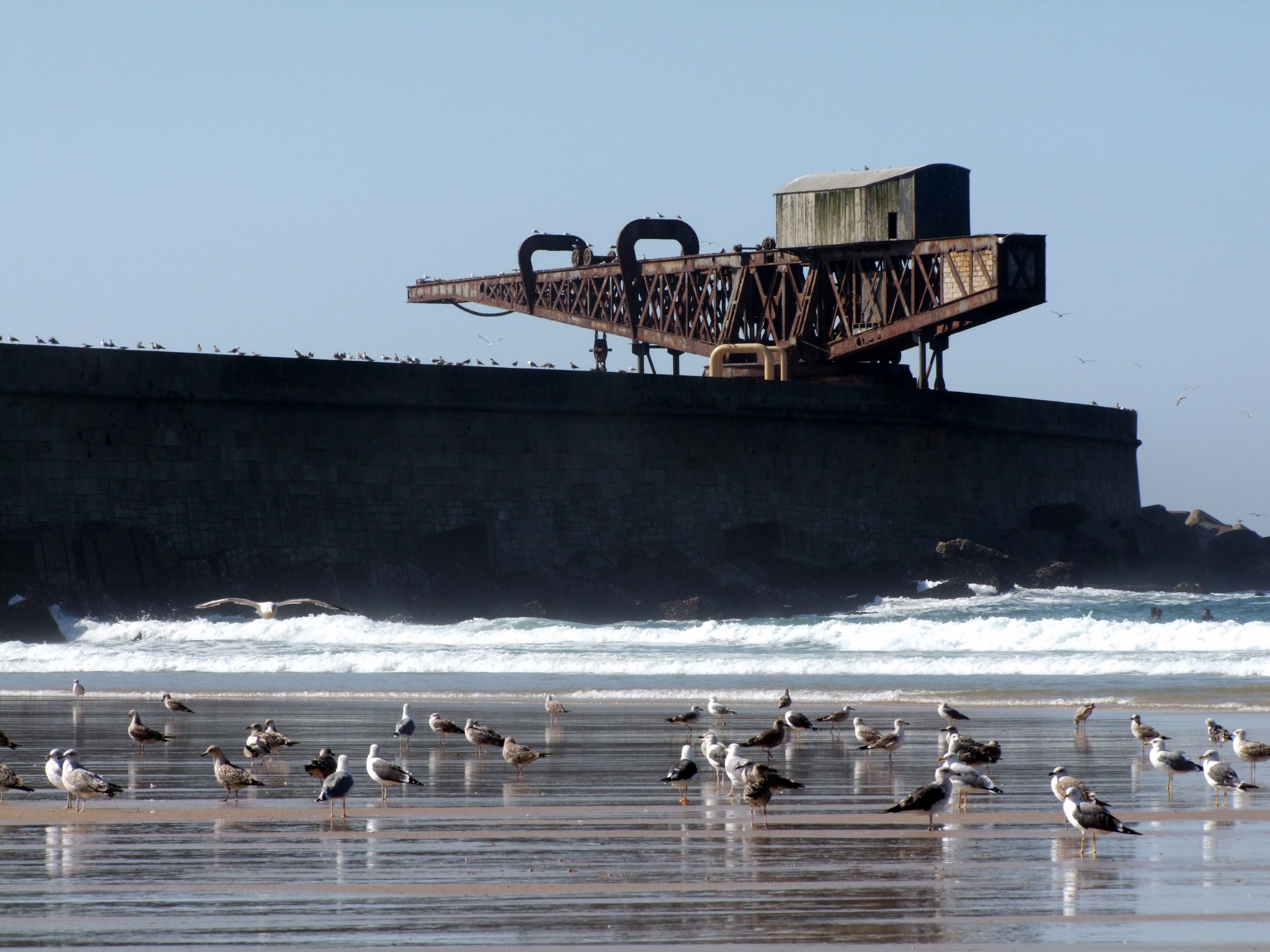
One of the Titan cranes in Leixões

The works involved the building of breakwaters using the custom made “Titan” cranes, large steam-powered block-setting cranes moved on rails. Manufactured by Fives in France and brought to Portugal for the project, the Titans were notable for their size, mechanical complexity, and mobility, which allowed them to advance along the breakwaters as construction progressed. After the breakwaters' completion, the Titans still carried out breakwater repairs between 1892 and 1899, following severe storms. Otherwise, the cranes remained in use in cargo handling operations until the mid-20th century.

The construction project also included the Ramal de Matosinhos, a railway line connecting the S. Gens stone quarry to the breakwater construction sites to facilitate the transport of heavy stone blocks. Hundreds of workers were involved in the extensive labor required to quarry, transport, and position the materials necessary for building the port's infrastructure.

Even before the harbour works were fully completed, Leixões began functioning effectively as a seaport. On 9 November 1886, less than three years after construction began, the first steamship entered the port and in the eight years that followed, Leixões serviced 2,308 ships and more than 30,000 passengers. The sheltered waters offered a safer and more efficient alternative to the hazardous bar of the Douro, allowing ships to avoid costly delays and navigational risks. The works were formally concluded on 16 February 1895.

=== Developing of the commercial seaport ===
Plans for commercial facilities began in 1888, but progress was slow. In 1893, following Nogueira Soares's death, a new commission proposed two docks, rail connections to the national network, a quarantine station, and space for future expansion into the Leça basin. However, immediate works were not undertaken, and in 1889 responsibility for Leixões's commercial development was transferred to the Companhia das Docas do Porto e dos Caminhos de Ferro Peninsulares (Company of Porto's Docks and of the Peninsular Railways).

In 1891, the government reorganised port administration, placing the Douro and Leixões ports under separate boards, each with different priorities. While Leixões was intended for future commercial development, the Companhia das Docas do Porto e dos Caminhos de Ferro Peninsulares made little progress, prompting the creation of a local commission in 1900 and an official engineering commission in 1902 to revisit plans.

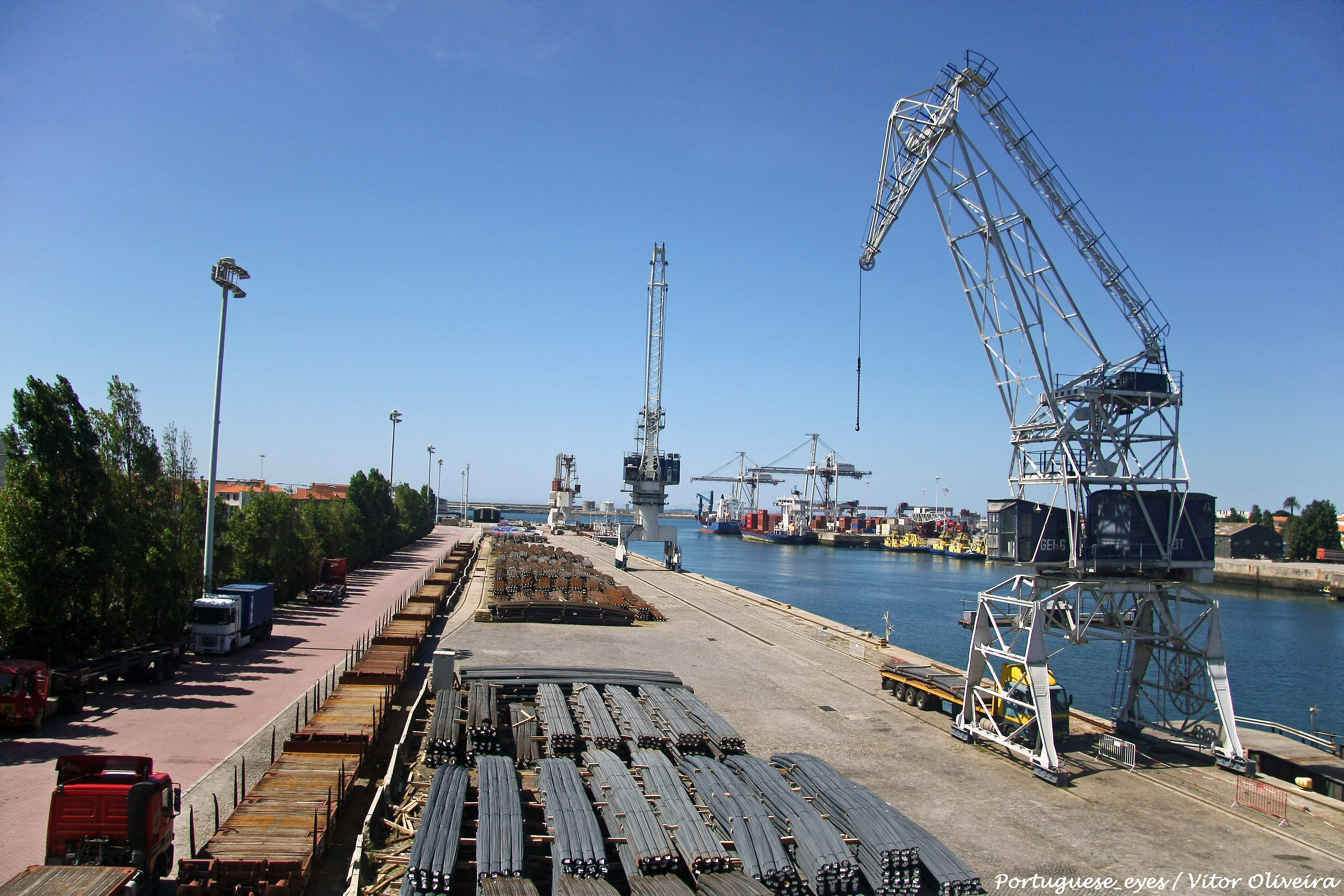
Dock 1 (South)

A new plan for Leixões' commercial seaport was presented in 1908 by engineers Adolfo Loureiro and António Santos Viegas. The design aimed to create a modern sheltered harbour about 10 metres (33 ft) deep to accommodate increasingly large ships. It proposed three main port sections extending into the Leça estuary, including new interior breakwaters to form an outer harbour for large vessels. Two docks were planned for commercial use: Dock 1, with two parallel quays allowing multiple ships to berth simultaneously, and Dock 2, larger and deeper, intended for longer operations and equipped for repairs, timber, and mineral cargo. The plan also featured railway connections, warehouses, and swing bridges to link both banks of the Leça River.

Severe floods in 1909 and 1911 strengthened calls to develop Leixões as Porto's main commercial harbour, overruling resistance from Douro river merchants. In 1911, the new republican government created the Junta Autónoma das Obras da Cidade, later renamed Junta Autónoma das Instalações Marítimas do Porto (Douro-Leixões), with representatives from Porto and Matosinhos municipalities, commercial associations, and railway interests. In 1912, it revived the 1908 plan for Leixões, modified to remove the swing bridges.

In 1913, the Portuguese parliament officially prioritized the development of Leixões as the main commercial port, relegating the Douro port to a secondary role. To oversee this, it created the Junta Autónoma das Instalações Marítimas do Porto (Douro–Leixões), granting it authority over port works on both sides of the Douro River. The law also proposed a major territorial reorganization: annexing neighboring parishes from Matosinhos into Porto's municipality. This was intended to ease local tensions by integrating the port area directly under Porto's administration, addressing opposition to having the port “outside” the city. However, this territorial change was never implemented.

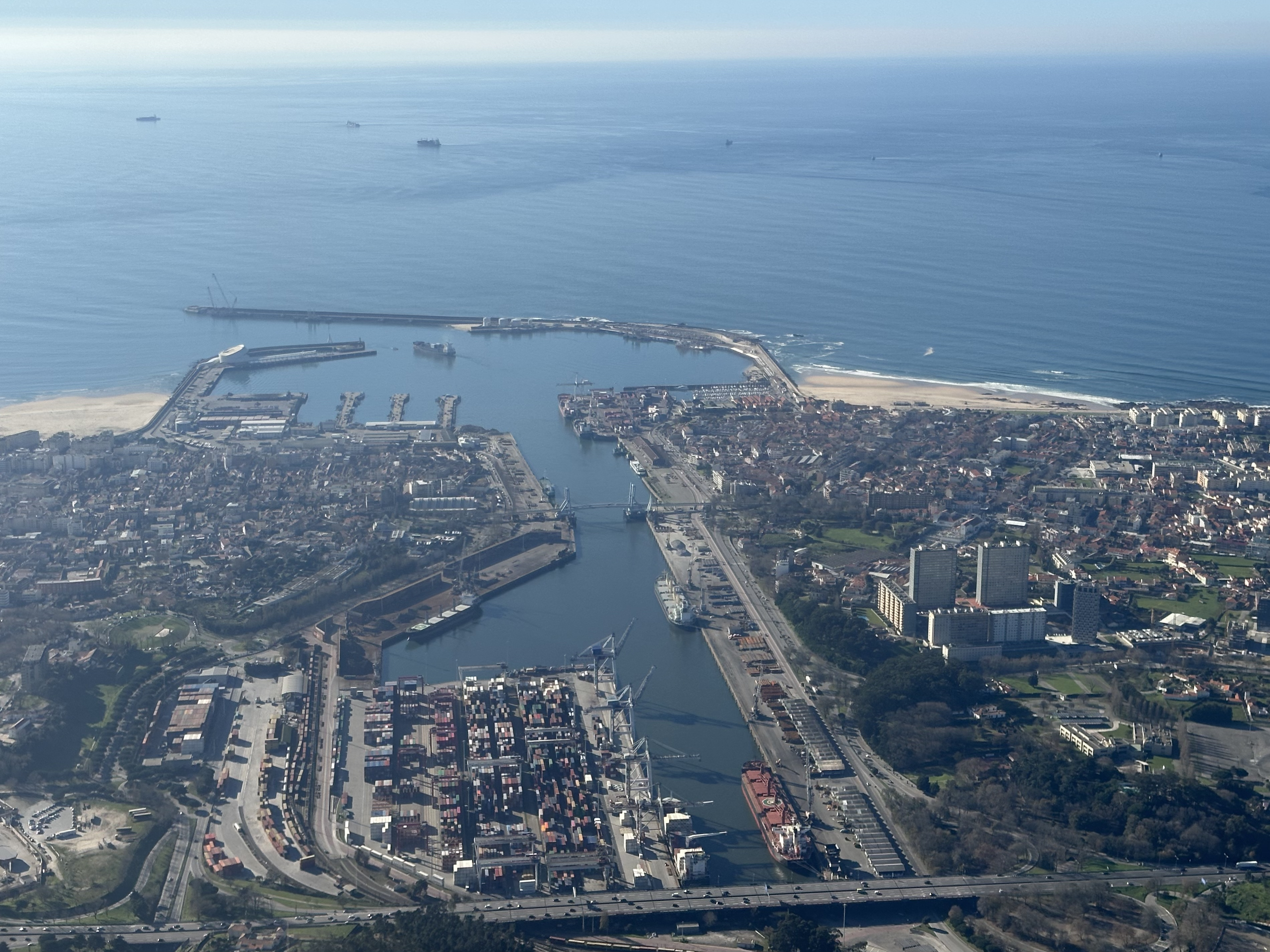
Aerial view of the Port.

Progress was slow due to World War I, but improvements were made to the southern breakwater and a substantial rectangular pier was built adjacent to it between 1914 and 1923.

The next major phase was the construction of Dock 1, which required diverting the Leça River outside the dock area via an aqueduct since the dock was to be built dry. After a failed attempt in the 1920s, construction was restarted in 1932 by the newly established port operator Administração dos Portos do Douro e Leixões (APDL). The project included three main works: a 1,000 metres (3,300 ft) exterior breakwater to reduce wave action inside the harbour, construction of Dock 1 with 1,000 metres (3,300 ft) of quay length, and dredging and rock-breaking to deepen the harbour. Despite challenges during construction, including damage to the breakwater, these works were completed by 1945 and officially inaugurated in 1940 during the Estado Novo’s bicentennial celebrations. By 1942, navigation companies were ordered to stop handling cargo on the Douro River due to difficulties at its bar, effectively sidelining the historic port. Over the following decades, commercial activity steadily declined, and in the 1980s, the remaining docks were largely deactivated as the area transitioned to leisure use.

=== Mid-20th Century Expansion and Modernization ===
1957 nautical chart of Leixões and Douro

By the mid-20th century, the port was handling over 1.2 million tonnes of cargo, more than double its designed capacity. New shipping methods and increasing post-war maritime traffic necessitated an expansion. The 1955 plan, led by engineer Henrique Schreck, set a long-term strategy for port growth. This plan laid out the construction of additional interior docks, a new movable bridge between Matosinhos and Leça da Palmeira, viaducts, and improved facilities, forming the basis of the modern port's layout. Construction works started in the 1950s and were complex, involving significant excavation, quay construction, and relocation of utilities. In 1959, the movable bridge opened, while the dock's northern quay opened in 1967.

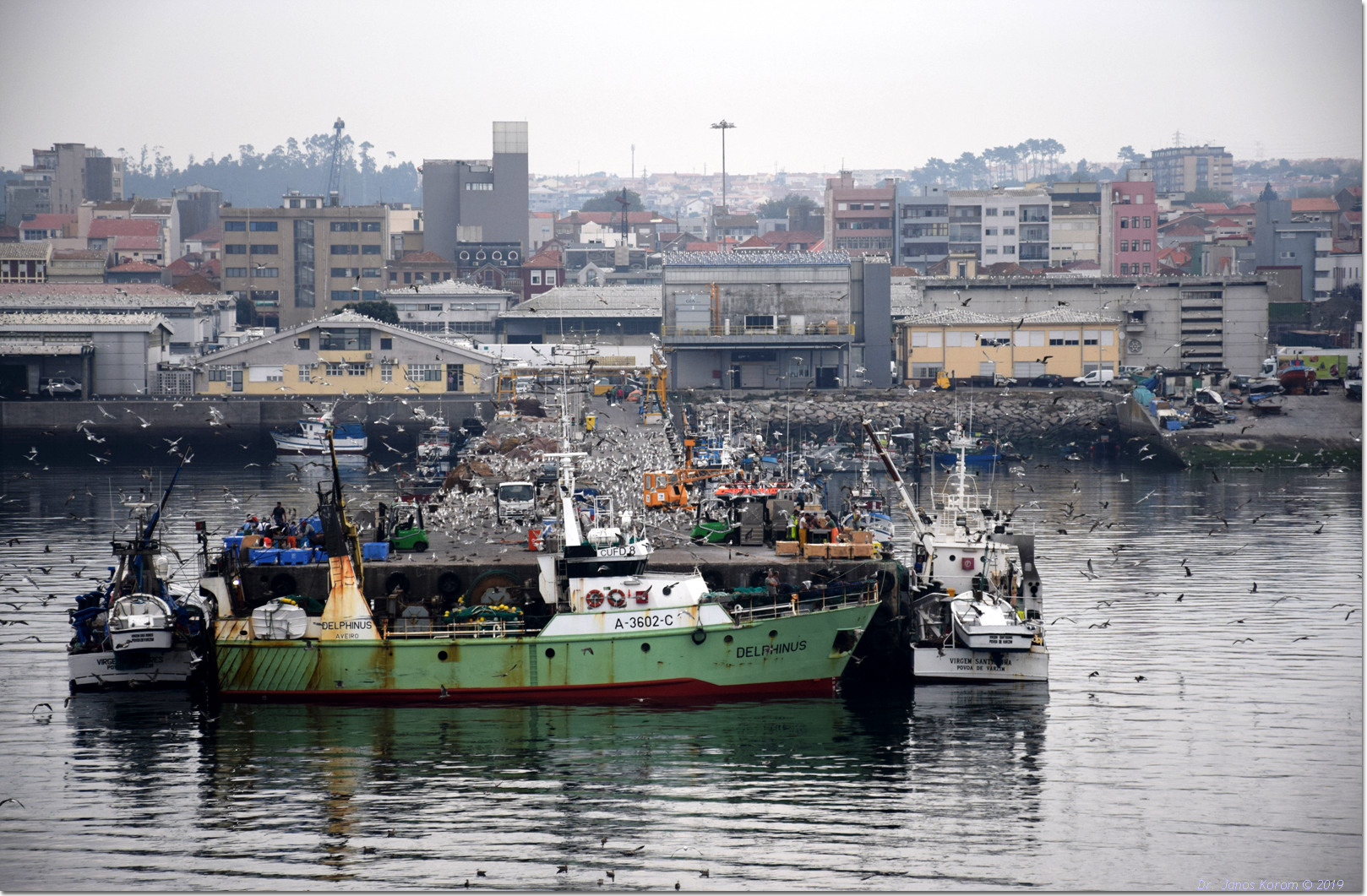
Fishing harbour

The subsequent II Plano de Fomento (1959–1964) continued these efforts with additional quay equipment, rail transport development, a tanker berth, and new administration buildings. The port's fishing facilities were also enhanced, with a new sardine fishing harbour inaugurated in 1963, improving conditions for what was already one of the world's largest sardine fishing ports.

During the 1960s, a terminal for oil tankers was built on the elevated exterior breakwater to supply the nearby Leça da Palmeira refinery by pipeline. Protective tetrapod structures were added to stabilize the breakwater, calming the harbour waters and adding a new functional dimension to the port, officially opening in 1969.

Work on Dock 4 began informally in 1974, after the country's return to democracy, creating over 1,200 metres (3,900 ft) of continuous quay. This dock was designed to handle general cargo, bulk, and later containerized cargo, becoming fully operational by 1989. Further improvements continued to optimize the container terminal.

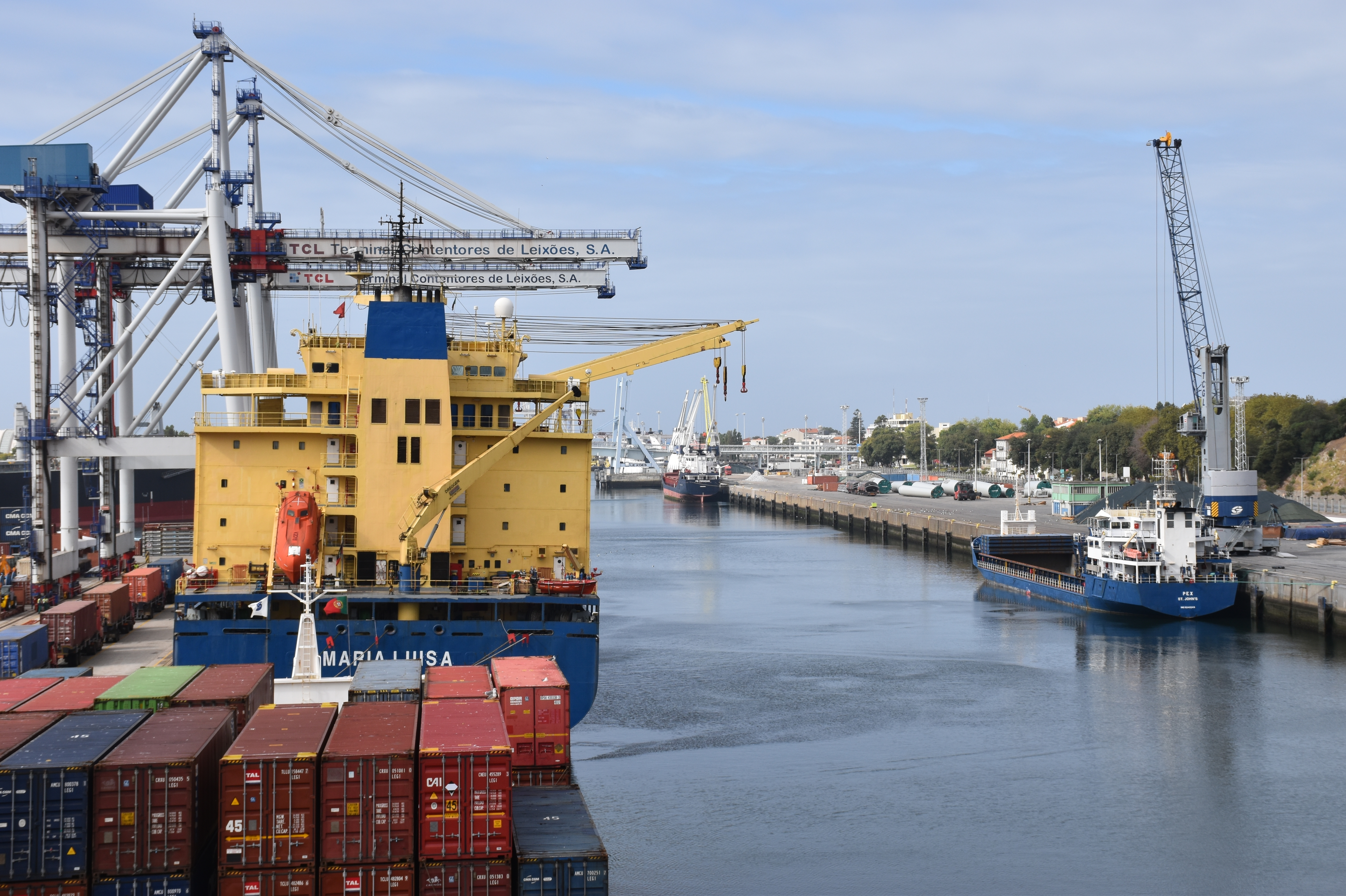
South Container Terminal (left) and Docks 2 and 4 (right)

Throughout the 1990s, the port authority developed a comprehensive master plan, enabling reorganization and expansion of services such as fuels, containers, bulk cargo, and roll-on/roll-off traffic. Investments included internal road networks like the Port Ring Road, inaugurated in 2001, and external access improvements, supported by European funding. In 1992, a marina was inaugurated, responding to growing recreational boating demand.

A cruise terminal was inaugurated on 23 July 2015, after a partial opening earlier in the year. Designed by architect Luís Pedro Silva, the €50 million facility covered 19,000 square metres (200,000 sq ft) and enabled cruises to begin and end at Matosinhos, increasing ship calls and passenger numbers. The main building also housed the headquarters of the Interdisciplinary Centre for Marine and Environmental Research (CIIMAR) of the University of Porto. The terminal complemented a new quay that had been inaugurated in April 2011.

In 2023, work began on a major modernisation and expansion of the Port of Leixões, with a total estimated cost of about €190 million. The project involved deepening the access channel and extending the north breakwater to improve efficiency, safety, and the capacity to accommodate larger vessels. It was designed to boost cargo and container operations, as well as other segments such as dry bulk. Plans also included the integration of renewable energy sources, energy-saving systems, and environmentally friendly practices to reduce the port's carbon footprint. The European Investment Bank supported the works with a €60 million loan, stating that the investment was expected to strengthen economic, social, and territorial cohesion by supporting trade, improving port accessibility, and contributing to the energy and digital transitions in the region.

== Facilities ==
The Port of Leixões is protected by two breakwaters extending from the northern and southern banks of the Leça River mouth. The outer harbour area, located at the river's mouth, contains facilities on both sides. The inner harbour lies within the Leça River estuary and contains several docks, numbered sequentially inland.

Conventional quays for general cargo and dry bulk are located at Docks 1 (north and south), Dock 2 (north and south), and Dock 4 North (grain terminal). All quays are equipped with cranes and they have a combined open storage capacity of 145,068 square metres (1,561,500 sq ft), while the grain terminal provides 4,000 square metres (43,000 sq ft) of covered storage. These facilities handle commodities such as timber, steel, granite, scrap metal, agro-food bulk goods, machinery, and project cargoes including wind turbines and transformers. The port also hosts grain silos with a total capacity of 120,000 tonnes located northwest of the grain terminal, a cement warehouse licensed to SECIL at Dock 1 South.

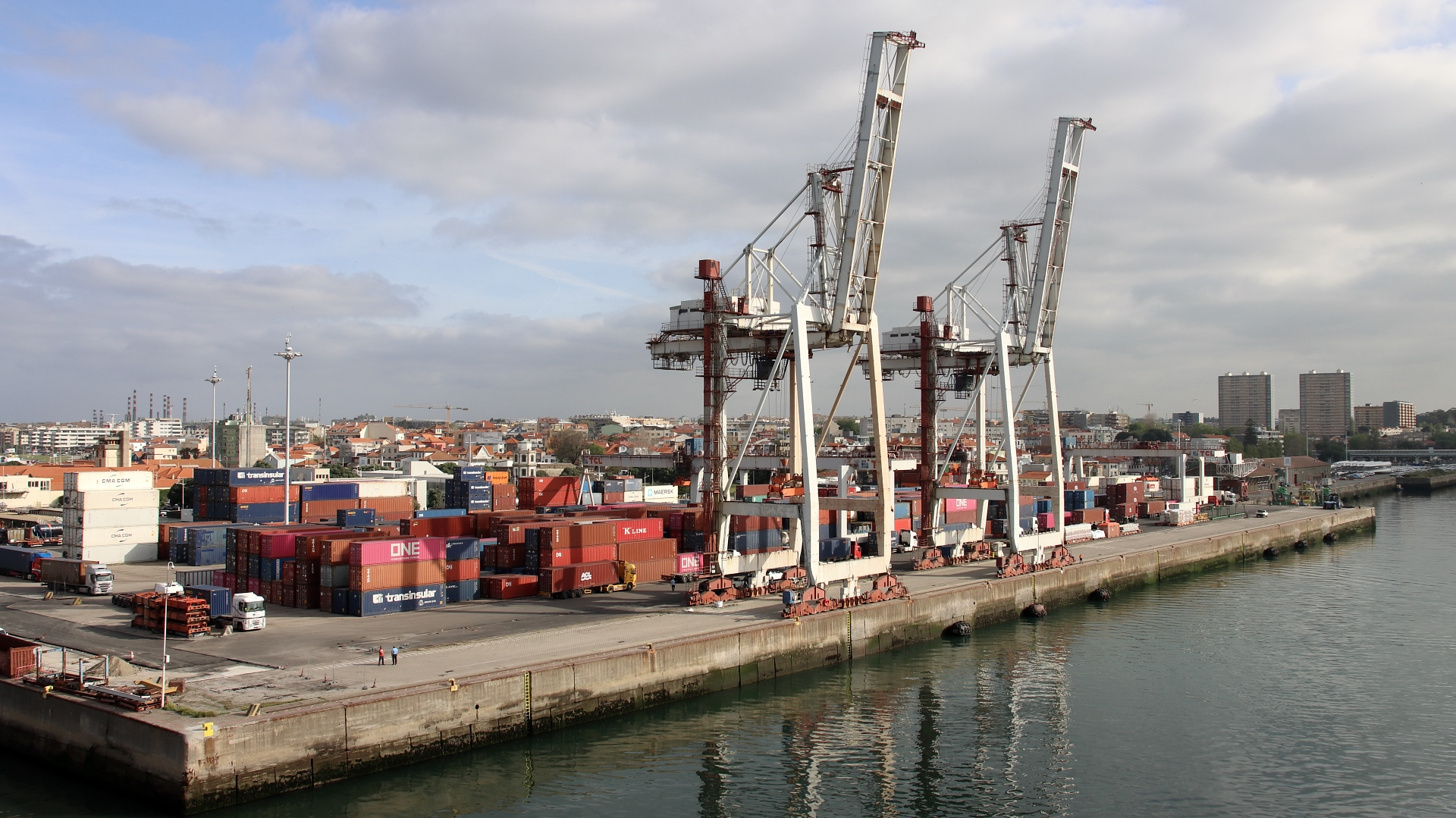
North Container Terminal

Leixões features two container terminals, with a total handling capacity of 770,000 TEU per year. The North Container Terminal, at Dock 1 North, has a 360 metres (1,180 ft) with depths of 10 metres (33 ft), and a storage area for 3,500 TEU and 72 refrigerated container sockets. The South Container Terminal, at Dock 4 South, has a 540 metres (1,770 ft) berth with depths of 12 metres (39 ft), with capacity for 14,100 TEU, and 544 refrigerated container sockets.

Liquid bulk operations are primarily undertaken in the Oil Tanker Terminal, located on the northern breakwater, which can handle ships of up to 150,000 DWT with depths of 30 metres (98 ft). Dock 2 South can handle asphalt products and fuel oil and features two pipelines, one for each cargo, to the CEPSA facilities in Matosinhos. The oil terminal was primarily used by Petrogal, featuring a pipeline to its refinery in Leça da Palmeira, however the refinery's closure in 2021 led to a significant drop in cargo.

The port features facilities to handle Ro-Ro at Dock 1 North, handling vehicles and heavy equipment, with parking space for about 100 trailers. The multipurpose terminal on the south breakwater supports both Ro-Ro and lift-on/lift-off traffic.

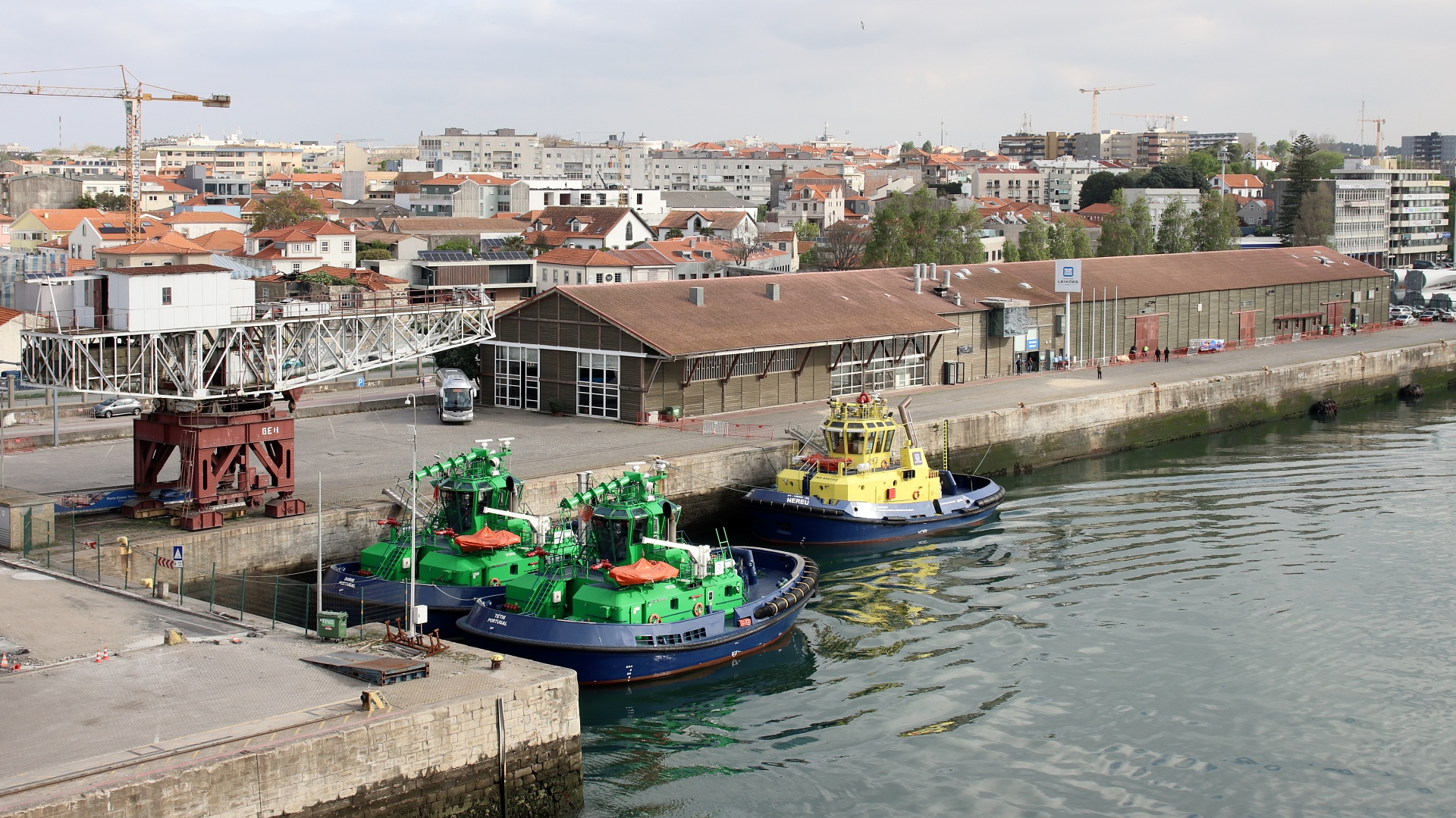
Leixões Passenger Station

Leixões has two cruise terminals and receives around 80,000 cruise ship passengers annually, most of them from the United Kingdom, Germany, and the United States. The North Cruise Terminal, at Dock 1 North, features the Leixões Passenger Station and can accommodate ships up to 250 metres (820 ft) in length and a depth of 10 metres (33 ft). The South Cruise Terminal, located on the south breakwater, can berth ships up to 300 metres (980 ft) in length and has a depth of 10 metres (33 ft). The terminal building houses passenger facilities as well as the Interdisciplinary Centre for Marine and Environmental Research (CIIMAR) of the University of Porto.

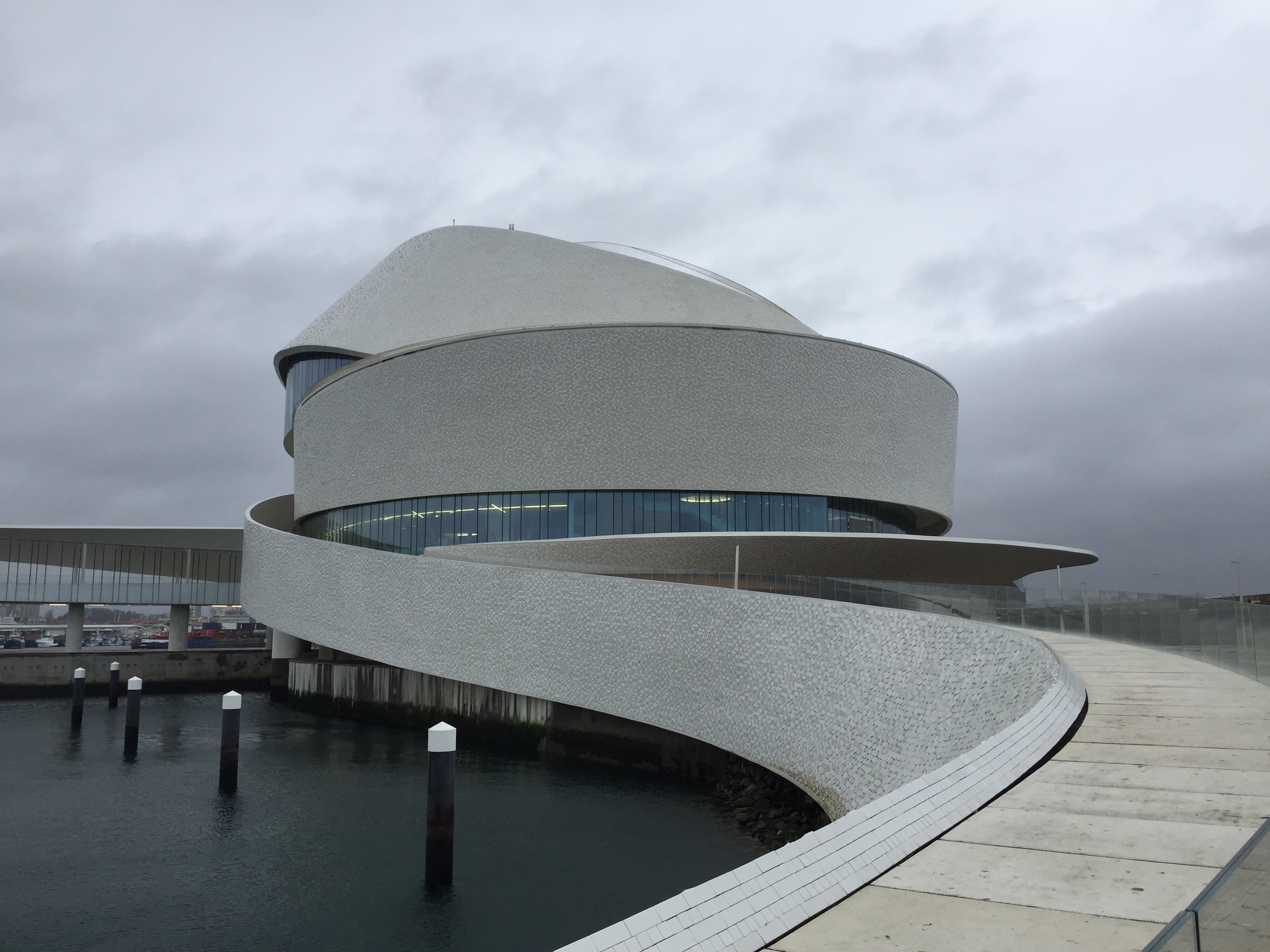
South Cruise Terminal

Leixões is Portugal's largest sardine port and the largest in coastal trawling catches. The fishing port, operated by Docapesca, has three quay walls for up to 66 trawlers with a combined length of 1,890 metres (6,200 ft). The port facilities include a computerized fish auction and cold storage and freezing facilities with a capacity of 5,500 tonnes.

Lastly, the port features a marina, located at the root of the north breakwater, which is leased to the Atlantic Marina Club Association. It has 248 permanent berths plus temporary mooring space for yachts.

== Statistics ==
In 2024, the Port of Leixões handled 14.4 million tonnes of cargo, with containers accounting for just under half of the total, followed by dry bulk, breakbulk cargo, ro-ro traffic, and liquid bulk. Annual volumes have generally increased since the early 1980s, when throughput stood at around 8.6 million tonnes, reaching over 19.6 million tonnes in 2019, driven by container traffic. Between 2019 and 2024, the Port of Leixões experienced a decline in cargo volumes, falling to 14.4 million tonnes. According to the port authority, the main cause has been the 2021 closure of the Petrogal refinery in Leça da Palmeira, which led to a sharp drop in liquid bulk traffic from 7.8 million tonnes in 2019 to 2.4 million tonnes in 2024.

Cargo throughput at the Port of Leixões, 1981–2024 (tonnes)
Year	Breakbulk cargo	Container	Ro-Ro	Dry Bulk	Liquid Bulk	Total
1981	1,989,000	720,000	0	1,489,000	4,385,000	8,583,000
1985	1,722,000	990,000	0	1,437,000	4,306,000	8,455,000
1990	1,695,000	1,494,000	12,000	1,566,000	7,368,000	12,135,000
1995	1,065,000	1,899,000	28,000	1,615,000	8,171,000	12,778,000
2000	853,000	2,728,000	36,000	2,089,000	7,841,000	13,547,000
2005	487,000	3,539,000	9,000	2,302,000	7,713,000	14,050,000
2010	596,000	4,992,000	23,000	2,235,000	6,730,000	14,576,000
2015	1,146,000	5,988,000	736,000	2,568,000	8,353,000	18,791,000
2016	1,200,000	6,387,000	902,000	2,381,000	7,450,000	18,320,000
2017	1,129,000	5,195,000	1,062,000	2,356,000	8,796,000	18,538,000
2018	993,000	6,702,000	1,158,000	2,582,000	7,775,000	19,210,000
2019	1,034,000	6,810,000	1,322,000	2,631,000	7,759,000	19,556,000
2020	999,000	7,004,000	1,336,000	2,184,000	5,554,000	17,077,000
2021	1,296,515	7,112,044	1,533,404	2,530,581	2,714,940	15,187,484
2022	1,208,523	7,036,092	1,457,253	2,836,191	2,352,540	14,890,599
2023	1,390,537	6,992,969	1,324,483	2,504,494	2,460,577	14,673,060
2024	1,439,886	7,164,858	1,196,138	2,230,067	2,350,844	14,381,793
Source: Administração dos Portos do Douro, Leixões e Viana do Castelo (APDL)
