= Valongo Municipal Chamber =

Legislative body of Valongo

Coordinates: 41.19090°N 8.49603°W

Valongo Municipal Chamber Câmara Municipal de Valongo
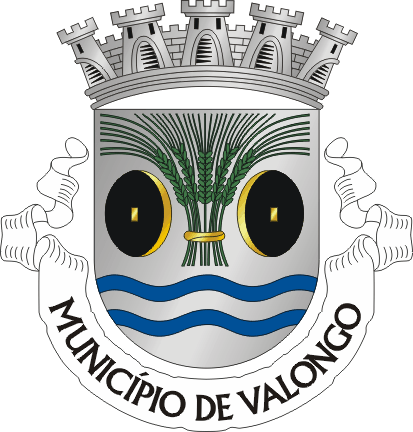
- Coat of arms of the city of Valongo

Type
- Type: Câmara municipal
- Term limits: 3

History
- Founded: 6 November 1836; 188 years ago

Leadership
- President: José Manuel Ribeiro, PS since 20 October 2021
- Vice President: Paulo Esteves Ferreira, PS since 20 October 2021

Structure
- Seats: 9
- Political groups: Municipal Executive (6) PS (6) Opposition (3) PSD (3)
- Length of term: Four years

Elections
- Last election: 26 September 2021
- Next election: Sometime between 22 September and 14 October 2025

Meeting place
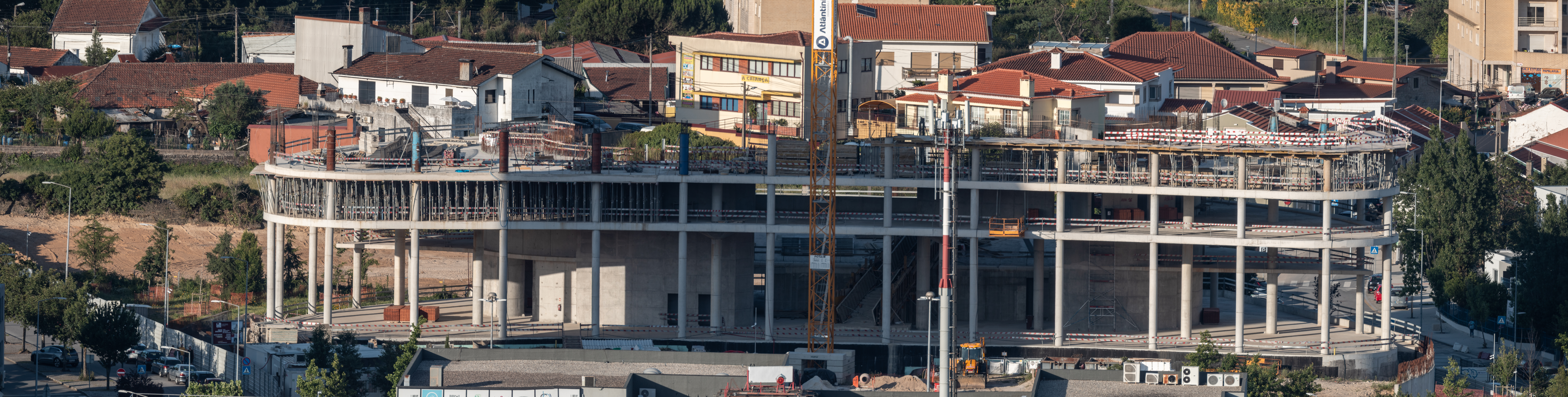
- Paços do Concelho de Valongo

Website
- www.cm-valongo.pt

The Valongo Municipal Chamber (Portuguese: Câmara Municipal de Valongo) is the administrative authority in the municipality of Valongo. It has 4 freguesias in its area of jurisdiction and is based in the city of Valongo, on the Porto District. These freguesias are: Alfena; Ermesinde; Campo e Sobrado and Valongo.

The Valongo City Council is made up of 9 councillors, representing, currently, two different political forces. The first candidate on the list with the most votes in a municipal election or, in the event of a vacancy, the next candidate on the list, takes office as President of the Municipal Chamber.

== City Hall building ==
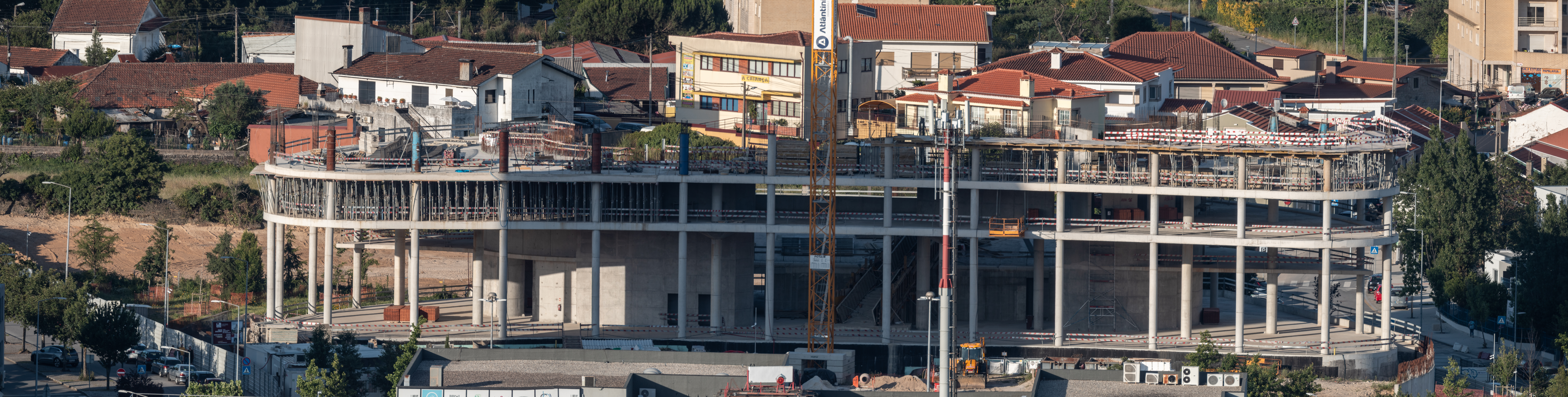
The new council under construction, 2024

A new building to replace the previous city council was presented to the public in 2019 and started being built in 2021, being halted temporarily until 2024. The previous building was being used temporarily since 1989, and was in need of replacement. Construction of its substitute is set to be finished by early 2026.

== List of the Presidents of the Municipal Chamber of Valongo ==
- João Moreira Dias – (1976–1979)
- Aires Fernando Martins – (1979–1982)
- João Moreira Dias – (1982–1993)
- Fernando Moreira de Melo – (1993–2012)
- João Paulo Baltazar – (2012–2013)
- José Manuel Ribeiro – (2013–2025)

(The list is incomplete)
