= Adriano Bessa =

Portuguese footballer (born 1976)

Personal information
- Full name: Adriano Pedro Bessa da Costa
- Date of birth: 18 December 1976 (age 49)
- Place of birth: Valongo, Portugal
- Height: 1.72 m (5 ft 7 1/2 in)
- Position: Right-back

Youth career
- 1987–1992: Ermesinde
- 1992–1995: Porto

Senior career*
Years	Team	Apps	(Gls)
1995–1997	União Lamas	40	(0)
1997–1998	Nacional	16	(1)
1998–2001	Gil Vicente	75	(2)
2001–2005	Vitória Guimarães	77	(1)
2005–2006	Naval	10	(0)
2006–2007	Boavista	2	(0)
2007–2009	Trofense	4	(0)
2009–2010	Gondomar	26	(4)
2010–2011	Espinho	18	(2)
Total		268	(10)
- * Club domestic league appearances and goals

Adriano Pedro Bessa da Costa (born 18 December 1976), known as Bessa, is a Portuguese retired professional footballer who played as a right-back.

== Club career ==
Bessa was born in Valongo, Porto District. After finishing his youth career at FC Porto, he went on to represent professionally C.F. União de Lamas, C.D. Nacional, Gil Vicente FC, Vitória de Guimarães (his most successful period in the Primeira Liga, although he was rarely a starter during his four-year spell), Associação Naval 1º de Maio, Boavista F.C. and C.D. Trofense.

In the main division, Bessa amassed totals of 145 games and two goals. He retired in June 2011 at the age of 34, following one season apiece in the third division with Gondomar S.C. and S.C. Espinho. On 2 July 2018, he was appointed sporting director at top-tier club C.D. Feirense.
