= Valongo =

- Municipality
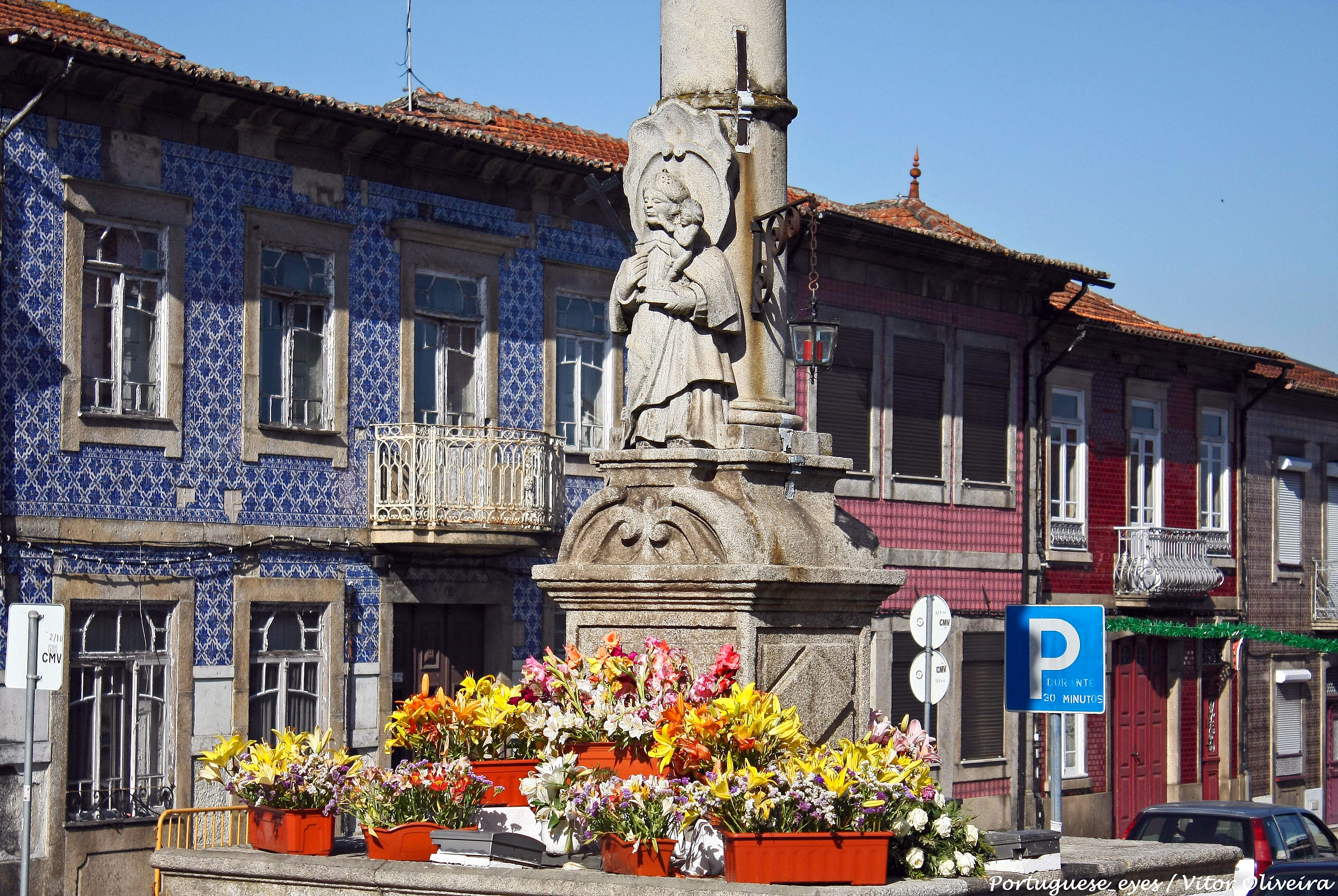
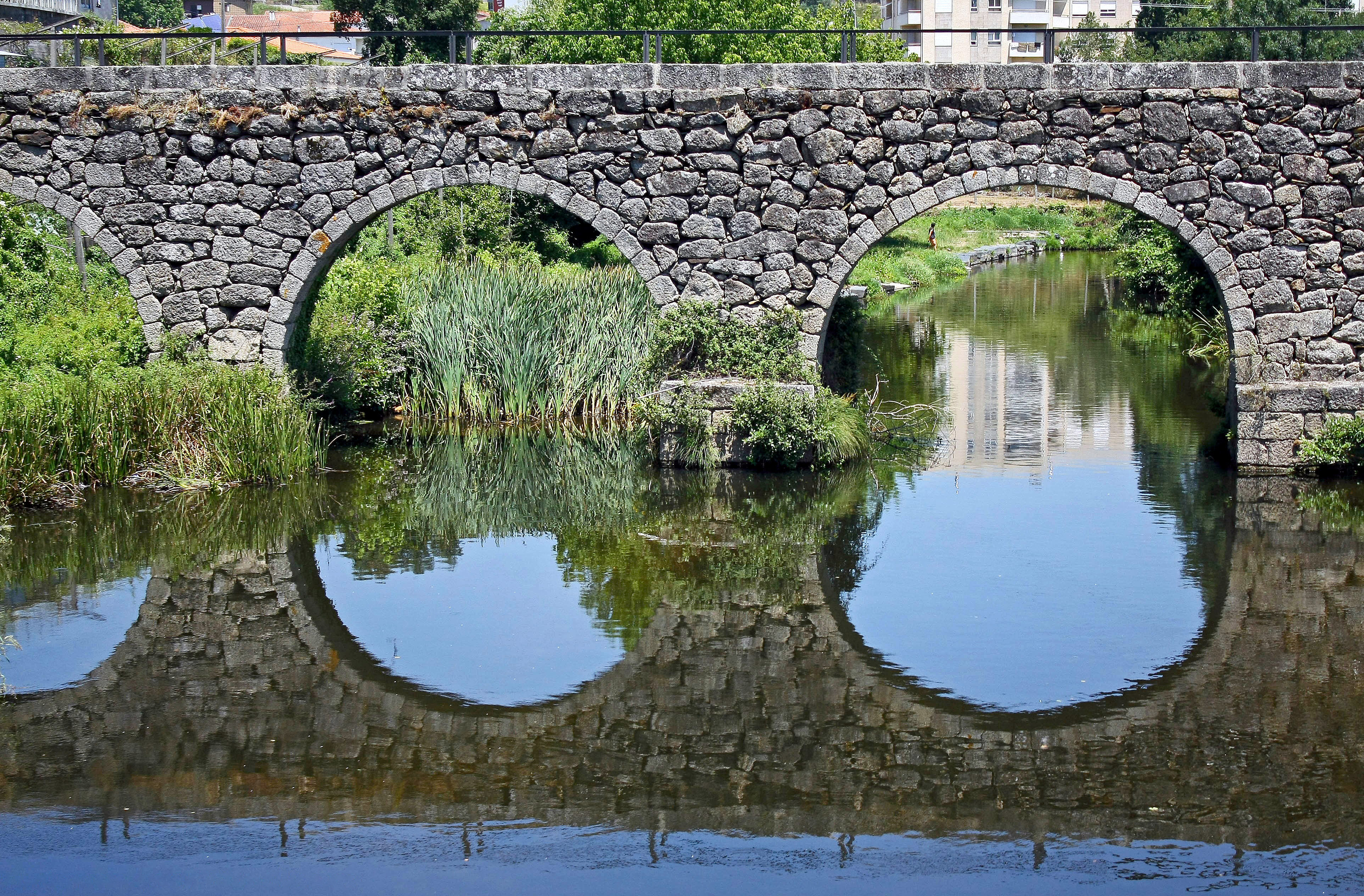
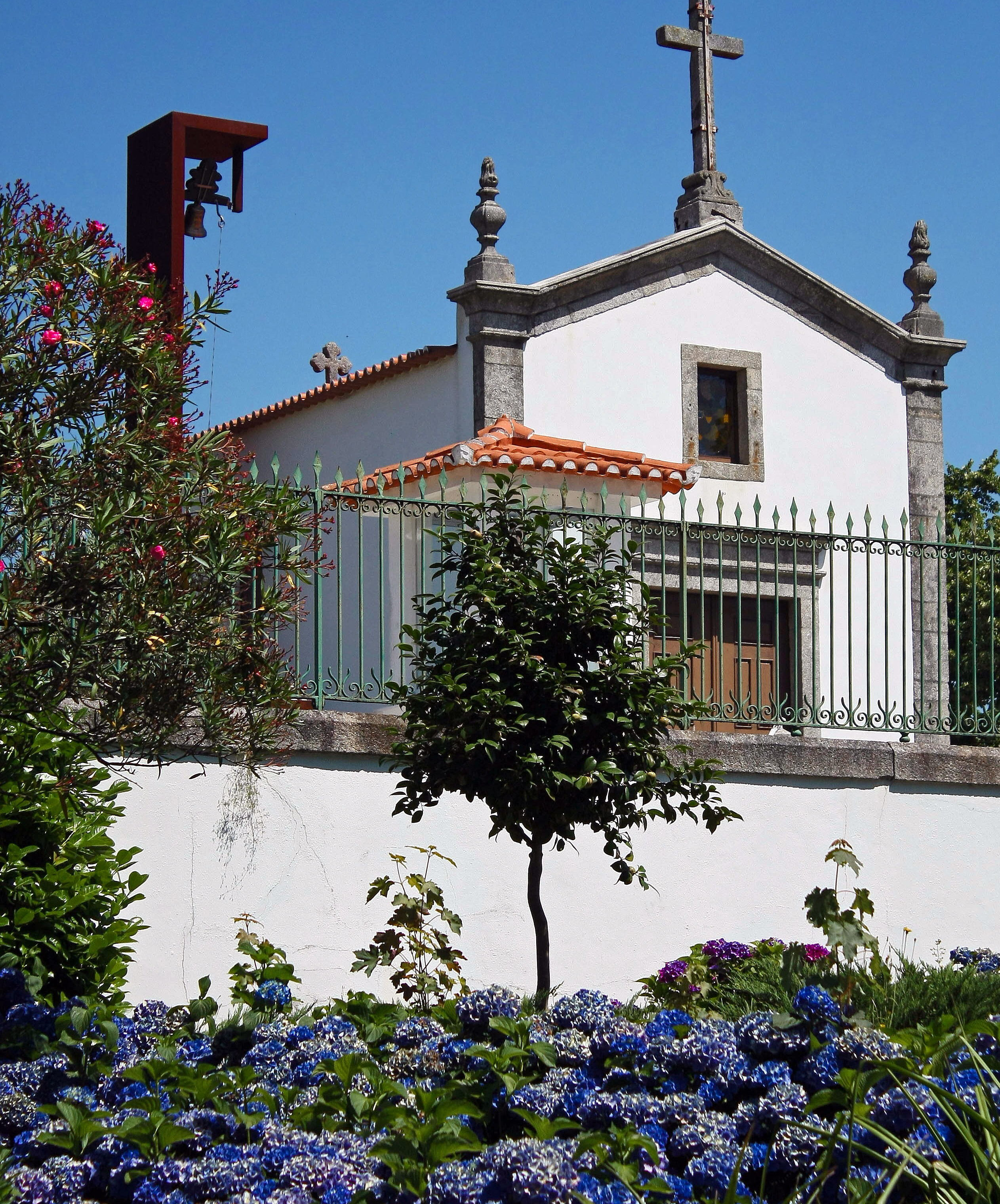
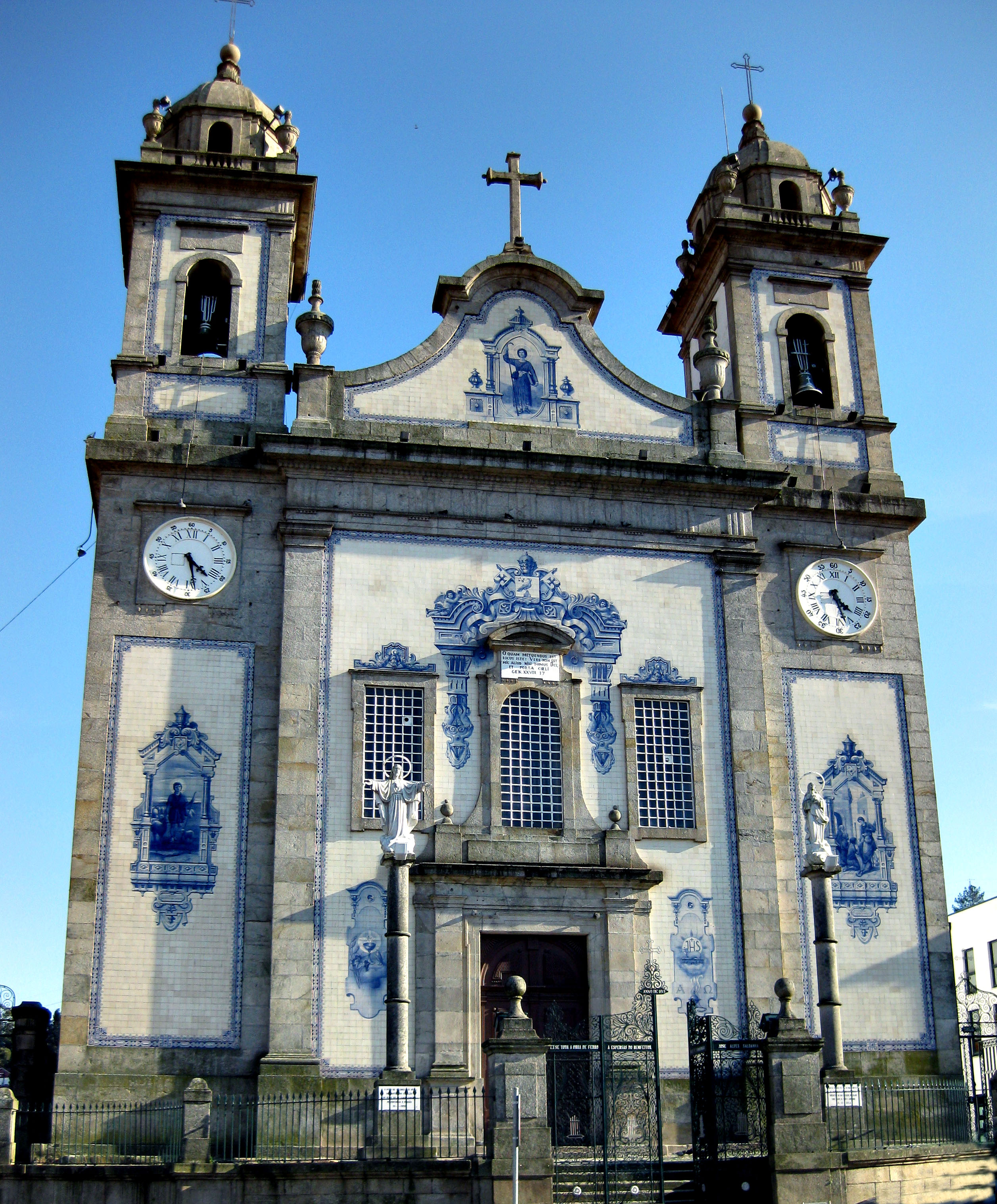
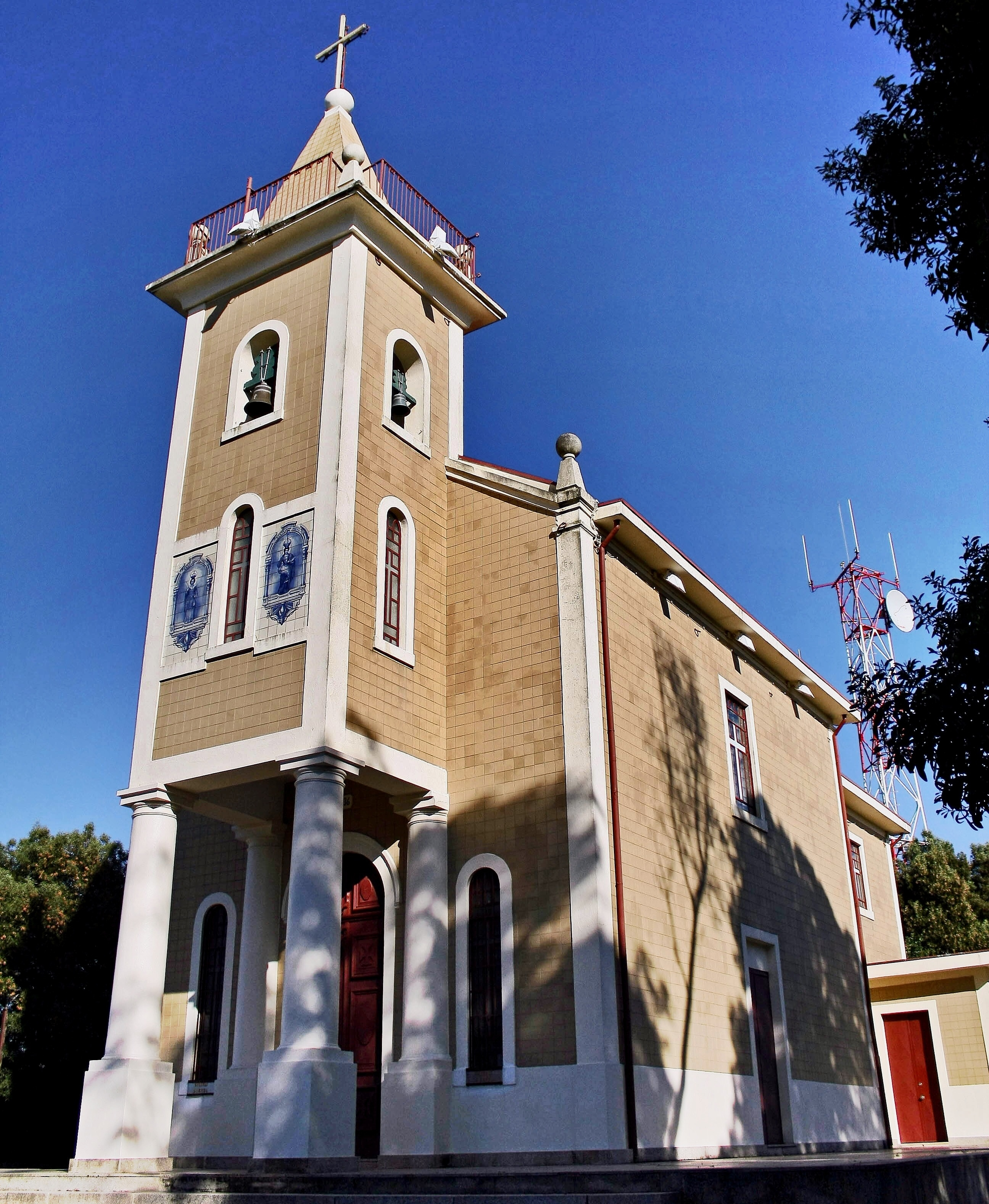
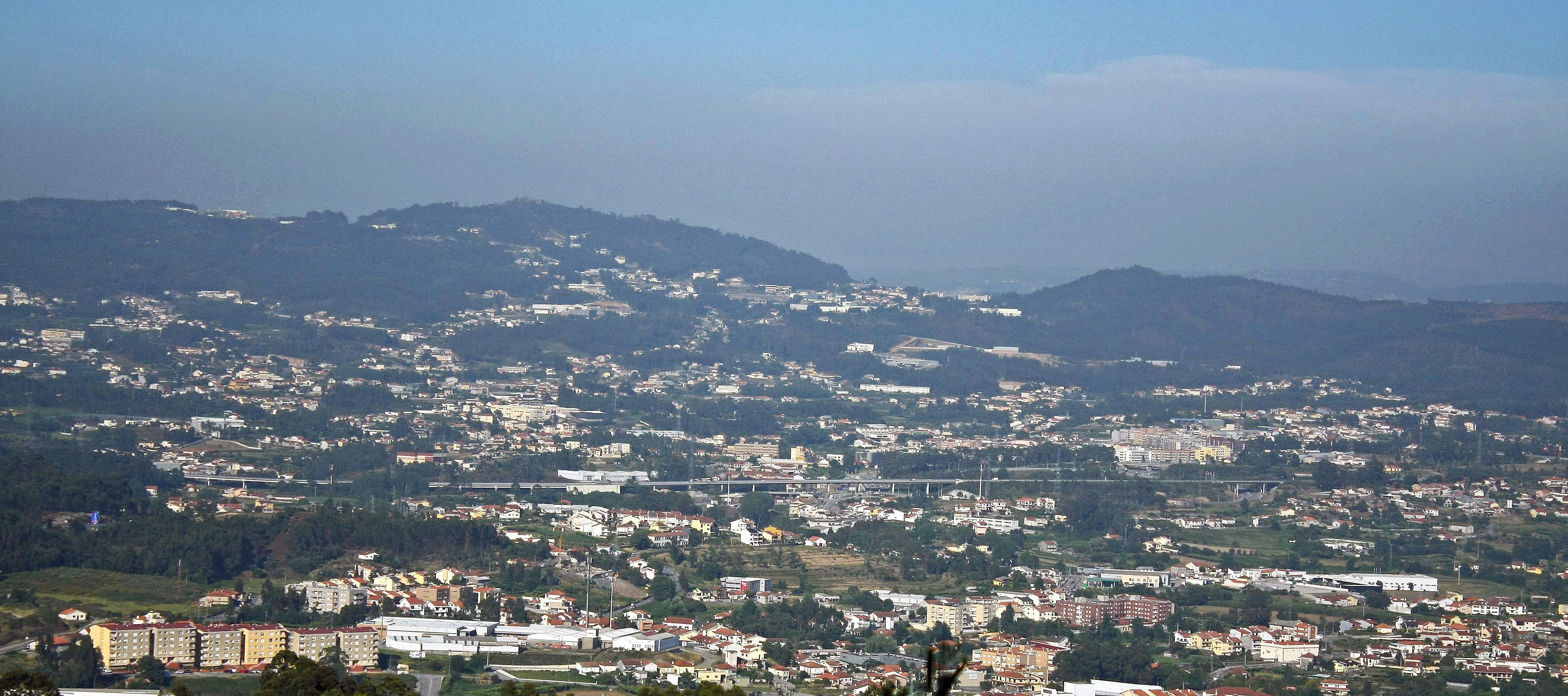

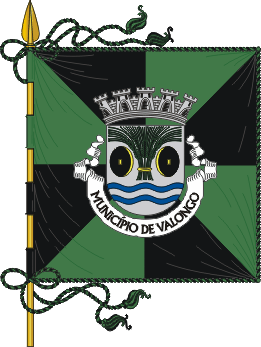
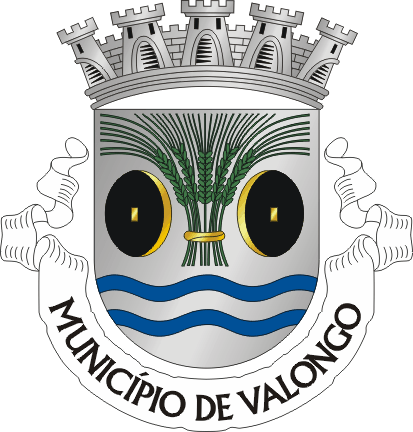
- Flag Coat of arms
- Interactive map of Valongo
- Coordinates: 41°11′N 8°30′W
- Country: Portugal
- Region: Norte
- Metropolitan area: Porto
- District: Porto
- Seat: Valongo Municipal Chamber
- Parishes: 4

Government
  - President: José Manuel Ribeiro (PS)

Area
  - Total: 75.12 km^{2} (29.00 sq mi)

Population (2021)
  - Total: 94,672
  - Density: 1,260/km^{2} (3,264/sq mi)
- Time zone: UTC+00:00 (WET)
  - Summer (DST): UTC+01:00 (WEST)
- Website: http://www.cm-valongo.pt/

Valongo (Portuguese pronunciation: [vɐˈlõɡu]) is a Portuguese city and municipality located in the District of Porto and 10 kilometres (6.2 mi) from Porto, in the northern region of Portugal.

The municipality area consists of 75.12 square kilometres (29.00 mi^{2}) and 94,672 inhabitants in 2021, and it is subdivided into four parishes: Alfena, Campo e Sobrado, Ermesinde and Valongo. The municipality is limited to the north by the municipality of Santo Tirso, to the northeast by Paços de Ferreira, to the east by Paredes, to the southwest by Gondomar and to the west by Maia.

In 2022, Valongo was awarded the European Green Leaf title by the European Commission for its environmental efforts, including forest conservation, climate adaptation, and circular economy initiatives.

== History ==
The Municipality of Valongo was created in 1836 as a part of the administrative reform of the country, which occurred during the reign of D. Maria II. However, human occupation of this region predates the Roman conquest of the Iberian Peninsula.

=== Ancient history ===
This region was occupied by the Romans, especially for gold mining in the Serra de Santa Justa. One of the traces of Roman occupation is in the municipality name, which originated in the Latin words Vallis Longus. There are still traces that would allow the detection of two main Roman connecting roads that would cross the municipality: the Porto - Guimarães road and the Alfena - Valongo - Aguiar de Sousa / Penafiel road.

This region would then be occupied by the germanic Suebi and Visigoths and later by Arabs and Moors. Toponyms in the municipality from this period include "Luriz" of germanic origin and “Moirama”, “Ilhar Mourisco” and “Alfena” from Arabic origin.

According to Father Lopes dos Reis, a native of Valongo, “the Moors entered Hespanha enthusiastic about the holy war with the alfange in one hand and Al Koran in the other, taking over with their powerful army all the places they could pass through. In Vallongo, perhaps there was no blood at all, because the inhabitants, few and without defense, could only fearlessly try to prevent the passage to a powerful enemy from whom they had known that an army of brave people had fled in terror. That is why, when the Arabs arrived in Vallongo (716), they left their people in peace without writing it, and by means of a certain tribute they gave them the freedom to live as they did here, going to settle far from the Goda settlement, which occupied the Susão and the western part of the villa, on the plain at the edge of a stream that was later called Ilhar Mourisco.”

After the reconquest of Portus Cale (Porto) by Vímara Peres in 868, he was named a count and given control of the frontier region between the Lima and Douro rivers by Alfonso III of Asturias, therefore bringing the region under control of the Kingdom of Asturias.

=== Middle ages ===
From the General Inquiries of 1258, the current municipality was divided at the time between the jurisdiction (julgado) of Aguiar de Sousa - which included S. Martinho de Campo and Sobrado, and the jurisdiction of Maia, which included S. Vicente da Queimadela, Valongo and S. Lourenço de Asmes.

From the economic and social point of view, at this time, the ownership of land was the basis of the economy and the main element of survival and power. In the area of the municipality, land belonged to the King and the Clergy - particularly the Regular Clergy.

The appearance of new settlements, the progressive extension of the term of existing settlements, the multiplication of suffragan chapels and the division of property, is evidence of the notorious demographic growth of this region over the centuries. This increase in population was accompanied by the progressive development of other sectors of the economy. Industry and commerce, initially based on incipient forms, acquire a strong expression in the economy. The traditional bakery industry is an excellent example of this: its origins date back to the Low Middle Ages, but the development of wheat bread is such a development, which allowed Valongo bakers to feed the entire surrounding region and with the product of their work. This, in turn, allows them to make a decisive contribution. for the construction of the new church, the Igreja Matriz de Valongo, whose construction dates to the end of the 18th century.

=== 19th century ===
At the dawn of the 19th century, Valongo experiences the hardship of the presence of Napoleon's troops, during the French Invasions. A division settled in Valongo, turning the church into a stable and plundering values from individuals and the church.

These lands, therefore, served as a stage for battles and military movements that took place between the two straying brothers: D. Pedro, on the side of the Liberals, D. Miguel, on the part of the Miguelists/Absolutists. During this period two important battles take place: the Battle of Ponte Ferreira and the Battle of the Ant. In Ermesinde, the former Convent of Nª. Mr. do Bom Despacho (now, the Church of St. Rita), became a military hospital for Miguelists forces.

By decree published on November 29, 1836, D. Maria II creates the Municipality of Valongo with the parishes of Sobrado, Campo and Gandra (which belonged to the Municipality of Baltar) and Alfena, Ermesinde and Valongo (which belonged to the Municipality of Maia).

On May 18, 1852, there was a lunch at Travagem offered by the Municipality chamber to the Royal Family composed of Queen D. Maria II, King D. Fernando II, then prince D. Pedro (future D. Pedro V) and then prince D. Luís (future D. Luís I). This lunch took place on the last visit of D. Maria II to the north of Portugal in the form of thanks for the creation of the Municipality of Valongo in 1836.

Years later, there would be another royal visit, this time by D. Luís and D. Maria Pia. "For a long time, there was still talk with great admiration of the gigantic and beautiful arches that were made in many places of passage of the procession and that gave the celebrations an admirable splendor."

Between the end of the 18th century and the beginning of the 20th century, large farming houses were built across the municipality. The road network was developed within the limits of the municipality, which began being served by transport such as the tram and train. The main artery of Valongo and Ermesinde saw the opening of commercial establishments. During this time, the local population increased with migration from the interior of Portugal.

By the middle of the 19th century, the region became an attractive site for the mining of slate, but also of antimony, tungsten and coal. At the borders of Ermesinde, large factories were set up, such as “Resineira”, “Cerâmica” - “Empresa Industrial de Ermesinde” and “Têxtil de Sá”, among others. The Municipality became the site for the expansion of industries such as metallurgy, textile manufacturing, civil construction, public works, food, wood and furniture. Compared to the other parishes, Campo and Sobrado retain a greater level of rurality. The smallholding regime sustain their living with traditional productions - the vine, the corn and the fodder, which is linked to the production of milk. New crops such as kiwi and also were introduced to the region.

== Demographics ==
Historical population
| Year | Pop. | ±% |
|---|---|---|
| 1864 | 8,511 | — |
| 1878 | 9,450 | +11.0% |
| 1890 | 11,188 | +18.4% |
| 1900 | 11,853 | +5.9% |
| 1911 | 13,811 | +16.5% |
| 1920 | 14,763 | +6.9% |
| 1930 | 17,239 | +16.8% |
| 1940 | 23,568 | +36.7% |
| 1950 | 27,939 | +18.5% |
| 1960 | 33,300 | +19.2% |
| 1970 | 41,265 | +23.9% |
| 1981 | 64,234 | +55.7% |
| 1991 | 74,172 | +15.5% |
| 2001 | 86,005 | +16.0% |
| 2011 | 93,858 | +9.1% |
| 2021 | 94,672 | +0.9% |
Source: INE

(Obs.: Number of inhabitants (Residents))

Number of inhabitants per Age Group
| | 1900 | 1911 | 1920 | 1930 | 1940 | 1950 | 1960 | 1970 | 1981 | 1991 | 2001 | 2011 |
| 0-14 | 4 305 | 5 186 | 5 420 | 6 019 | 8 596 | 9 646 | 12 259 | 15 380 | 19 503 | 16 466 | 15 349 | 15 539 |
| 15-24 | 2 229 | 2 475 | 2 901 | 3 589 | 4 112 | 5 392 | 5 627 | 6 840 | 11 913 | 13 937 | 13 060 | 10 480 |
| 25-64 | 4 570 | 5 272 | 5 713 | 6 876 | 9 447 | 11 421 | 13 788 | 16 960 | 28 969 | 38 470 | 49 173 | 55 353 |
| = or > 65 | 633 | 633 | 605 | 782 | 1 051 | 1 390 | 1 626 | 2 085 | 3 849 | 5 299 | 8 423 | 12 486 |
| > Age unknown | 35 | 27 | 26 | 26 | 60 | | | | | | | |

(Obs: From 1900 until 1950, data refers to de facto population, who were present in the region. Hence, some differences can be expected relative to the resident population.)

== Administration ==
Administratively, the municipality is divided into 4 civil parishes (freguesias):

- Alfena
- Campo e Sobrado
- Ermesinde
- Valongo

== Culture ==
Religious Patrimony

The municipality has a vast religious patrimony, which includes the Mother Churches, chapels, shrines, calvaries and cruises, often associated with religious festivities and local folk stories. Bugiada e Mouriscada is a festivity where populars stage a fight between Bugios (christians) and Mourisqueiros ( non-believers) by the possession of John the Baptist, alongside other folk and everyday lives activities.

Slate

There's a strong presence of slate mining industry and different transformative industries associated with slate, whose industrialization began in the 19th century and matured in the 20th century. Slate was formed 350 million years ago by a metamorphosis of shale, clay and volcanic ash that results to a fine-grained foliated rock. Common application and uses of slate can be found in writing slates, blackboards, as a roofing material, for billiard table tops and in the decoration industry. The Slate Museum (Museu da Lousa) is located in the town of Campo.

Portuguese traditional toys

Alfena is home to an industry of handmade portuguese traditional toys, made using different kinds of available, and often recycled, materials including paper, wood, plate, celluloid and plastic. Toys often depict objects used in daily tasks.

Regueifa and Biscuits

Regueifa is a form of bread popular in northern Portugal. The manufacture of bread in Valongo has been documented since the Middle Ages. In addition to being an indispensable daily food, a means of paying forums, it is likely that the biscuit was part of the sailors' rations during the period of the discoveries, thus paving the way for the manufacture of the biscuit that we know today. With the introduction of American big corn, the bread came to prominence and with the French invasions the “mollet” started to be produced. Currently, regueifa is considered a delicacy in the world of bread, with the regueifa of Valongo being famous in northern Portugal.

== Sports ==
Valongo has a strong tradition in roller hockey, centered around Associação Desportiva de Valongo. Known for its passionate local support, the club has consistently recorded some of the highest attendance figures in Portuguese roller hockey. Founded in the early 1970s, the club currently fields multiple youth and senior teams. Its matches are hosted at municipal sports facilities in the city.

The municipality is also home to Clube Desportivo de Sobrado, a football club based in the parish of Sobrado. The club currently competes in the Elite Série 2 of the Porto Football Association and has previously played in the Campeonato de Portugal and the Taça de Portugal.

== Infrastructure ==
=== Transports ===
Valongo's transport infrastructure connect it to Porto and the wider Porto Metropolitan Area. The municipality is traversed by highways A4 and A41 and National Roads 15, 105, 209. Public transportation to Valongo includes railway and bus services.

The municipality includes two larger railway stations in Ermesinde and Valongo and stops in Palmilheira, Cabeda, Suzão, São Martinho do Campo and Travagem. Ermesinde station is located at the intersection between the Douro and Minho lines and is serviced by suburban and inter regional railway services to Porto, Braga, Guimarães, Viana do Castelo, Marco de Canaveses, Régua and Pocinho. The station in Valongo and all stops except Travagem are located in the Douro line and are serviced by suburban trains between Marco de Canaveses and Porto. The stop in Travagem is located on the Minho line and is serviced by suburban trains running between Porto and Braga or Guimarães.

UNIR and STCP provide most local bus services to Valongo, connecting it to Porto and other areas of Porto Metropolitan Area. Auto Viação Pacense operates two routes between Porto and Paços de Ferreira, via Alfena, while Auto Viação Landim operates a route between Celorico de Basto and Porto, via Valongo. Lastly, Rodonorte operates bus services between Porto and Felgueiras, Lixa and Amarante, via Valongo.

=== Healthcare ===
There are three hospitals in Valongo municipality, one public and two private. The public hospital is a part of the University Hospital of São João and it is located in the center of Valongo. One private hospital is located in Alfena, while the other is in the parish of Campo e Sobrado.

== Notable people ==
- Adriano Bessa (born 1976), a former footballer who played as a right-back.
- Francisco Chaló (born 1964), a football manager and former footballer.
- Martim Fernandes (born 2006), a professional footballer who plays as a right-back.
- António Dias de Oliveira (1804-1863), the President of the Council of Ministers in 1837.
- Josué Pesqueira (born 1990), known as Josué, a footballer with over 260 club caps and 4 for Portugal.
- Filipa Pinto (born 1971), a politician from the LIVRE party and member of the Assembly of the Republic.
- Nuno Ribeiro (born 1977), a former professional road bicycle racer.
- Bruno Silva (born 1988), a cyclist.
- Rui Vinhas (born 1986), a cyclist.

== See also ==
- Serras do Porto Park
