= Linha de Leixões =

Portuguese railway line

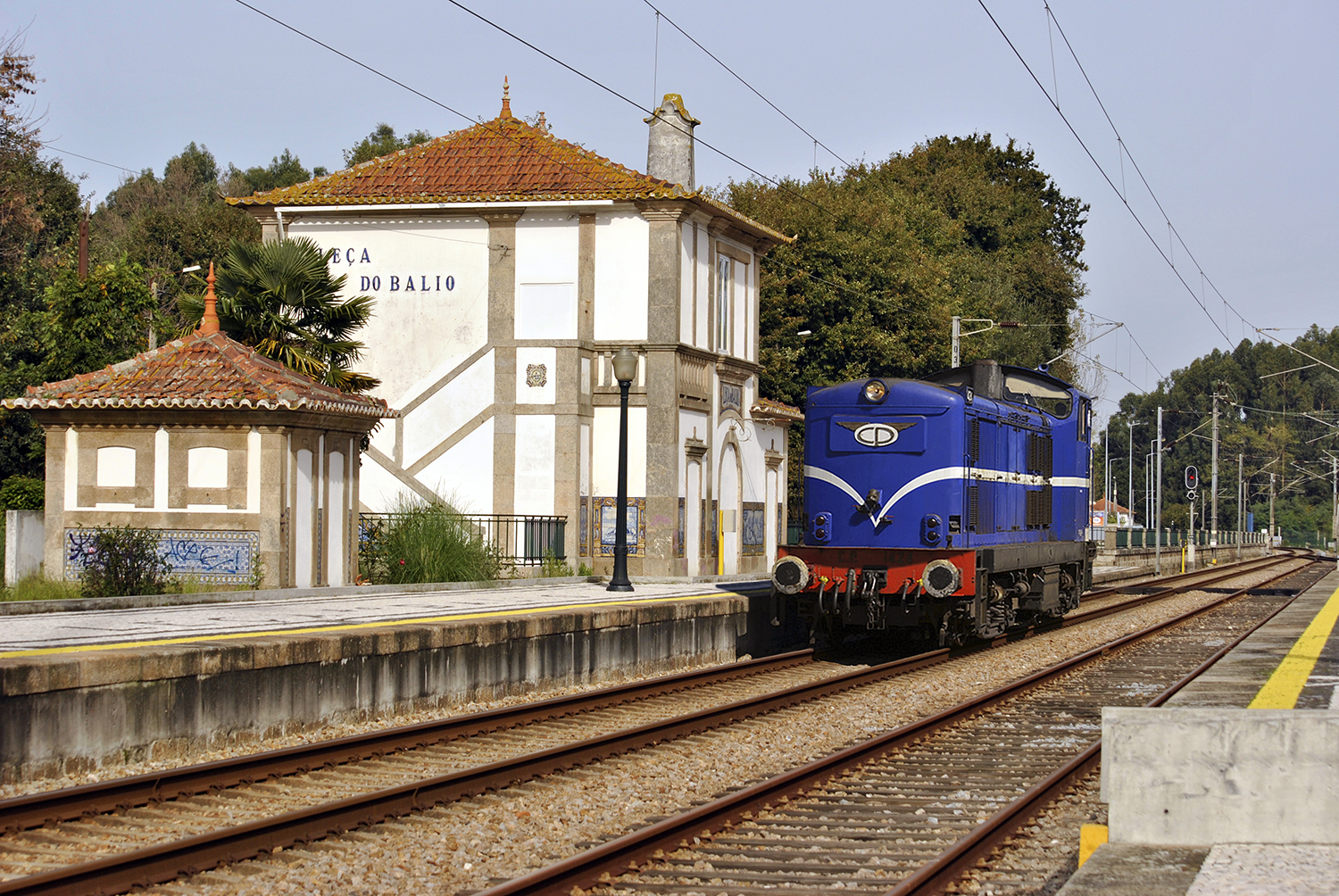
- Leça do Balio railway station.

Overview
- Status: Operational
- Owner: Infraestruturas de Portugal
- Locale: Porto metropolitan area
- Termini: Contumil; Leixões

Service
- Operator(s): Comboios de Portugal

History
- Opened: 1938

Technical
- Line length: 18.9 km (11.7 mi)
- Number of tracks: 1
- Track gauge: 1,668 mm (5 ft 5 21/32 in) Iberian gauge
- Electrification: 25 kV / 50 kHz Overhead line

Location on the network
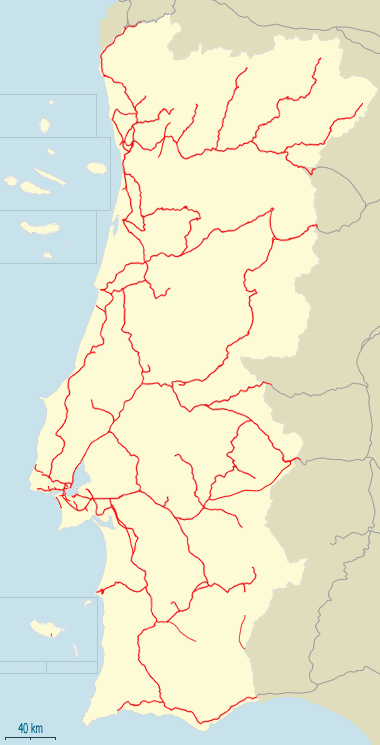

+ Contumil × Leixões (🔎)

Linha de Leixões, (also known as Linha de Cintura do Porto, or Linha da Circunvalação de Leixões) is a railway line in Portugal which connects the railway stations of Contumil in Porto and Leixões, in Matosinhos. The line opened in 1938, connecting the Port of Leixões to the Minho Line and to the rest of the Portuguese railway network, serving as an important link for cargo. It is an electrified single track in Iberian gauge stretching over 18.9 kilometres (11.7 mi), equipped with EBICAB 700 control systems and RSC communications.

Passenger services had previously run until 1987 and between 2009 and 2011. Passenger services restarted in 2025, between Leça do Balio and Contumil, with Campanhã or Ovar as their destination. During weekdays, 60 passenger trains are operated per day, 30 in each direction, with up to two trains per hour, whereas only 34 trains run during weekends. The travel time between Campanhã and Leça do Balio ranges from 19 to 27 minutes, depending on the schedule.

While passenger services did not resume on the segment between Leça do Balio and Leixões, a bus service was arranged, starting in March 2025. This is expected to help measure the demand for such a service. The terminus in Leixões would allow for a connection with Porto Metro at Senhor de Matosinhos.

== History ==
=== Planning and construction ===
The idea of a railway line connecting the Port of Leixões to the Minho Line was first proposed in the Complementary Network Plan North of Mondego, approved by a decree on January 15, 1900. The plan aimed to integrate the rapidly modernizing port with the broader national transport network. Initial studies for the line were conducted in 1900 by engineer Fernando de Souza, who proposed a major freight yard in Contumil to facilitate the sorting and storage of goods from the port. This proposal was approved in 1902, and the project for the line was officially issued on July 4, 1905.

However, construction did not commence until 1921, due to the complexity of the terrain and the need for significant engineering works, including two bridges. The line required extensive infrastructure to navigate its urban and industrial surroundings, with multiple overpasses, underpasses, and crossings, such as the Ranha overpass, the Circunvalação Road underpass and crossings over the Póvoa and Guimarães railway lines now used by the Porto Metro.

The line was finalized on July 19, 1938 and although it was designed to transport cargo, it was initially used to transport passengers. It connected the city of Porto and its surroundings with the port, driving urbanization along its axis.

=== Restarting passenger services ===
Passenger services came to an end in 1987, and the railway line was modernized and electrified in 1998. In 2009, an attempt was made to restart passenger transport, with plans to upgrade infrastructure and build two new stations: São João (near the hospital) and Arroteia (near EFACEC). However, these stations were not constructed, and consequently the line only transported 70,000 passengers per year, leading to an average daily ridership of under 5 people per train. With losses of 2 million euros annually, passenger services were discontinued again in January 2011.

In 2024, a 32 million Euro investment was carried out to improve conditions on the line for freight trains and to reestablish passenger services in part of the line. The investment included the removal of four level crossings, the replacement and upgrade of a railway bridge over the Leça River and the improvement of the tracks in Leixões so it allowed for trains up to 750 meters in length. The passenger railway stations were also be refurbished, with two new stops at Hospital São João and Arroteia.

On February 9, 2025, passenger services resumed on the Leixões Line after a 14-year hiatus, between the railway stations of Contumil and Leça do Balio, with stops in São Gemil, Hospital São João, São Mamede de Infesta and Arroteia. These services were meant to improve connectivity to one of Porto's largest hospitals, some faculties of the University of Porto and several established businesses, who lobbied for the return of services.

== Station buildings ==
The station buildings along the Leixões Line exhibit a cohesive architectural style characterized by the "Português Suave" design.

The Leixões station, located in Matosinhos, was constructed in the 1930s and serves primarily as a freight hub, facilitating the transfer of goods and containers between the Port of Leixões and the national railway network. The station building has a rectangular floor plan and is composed of two high floors built with traditional stone masonry. It features decorative elements in yellow granite, including window frames, friezes, cornices, and a curved pediment topped with an armillary sphere and a shield. The corners of the building are accentuated with stone pilasters that extend above the eaves and are crowned by pinecone-shaped finials. The ground floor is adorned azulejo (ceramic tile panels), typical of the period, with floral patterns prominently displayed on the gables.

At Leça do Balio, the passenger building was renovated in the 21st century. Its facades are decorated with a series of azulejos depicting rural scenes, views of the Douro River, and the Maria Pia Bridge. These tiles were produced at the Constância Factory in Lisbon under the artistic direction of Leopoldo Battistini. The São Mamede de Infesta station similarly features azulejos on its platform facades, illustrating daily life and local landscapes, including scenes from Porto and the Douro.

== See also ==
- List of railway lines in Portugal
- List of Portuguese locomotives and railcars
- History of rail transport in Portugal
