= University Hospital of São João =

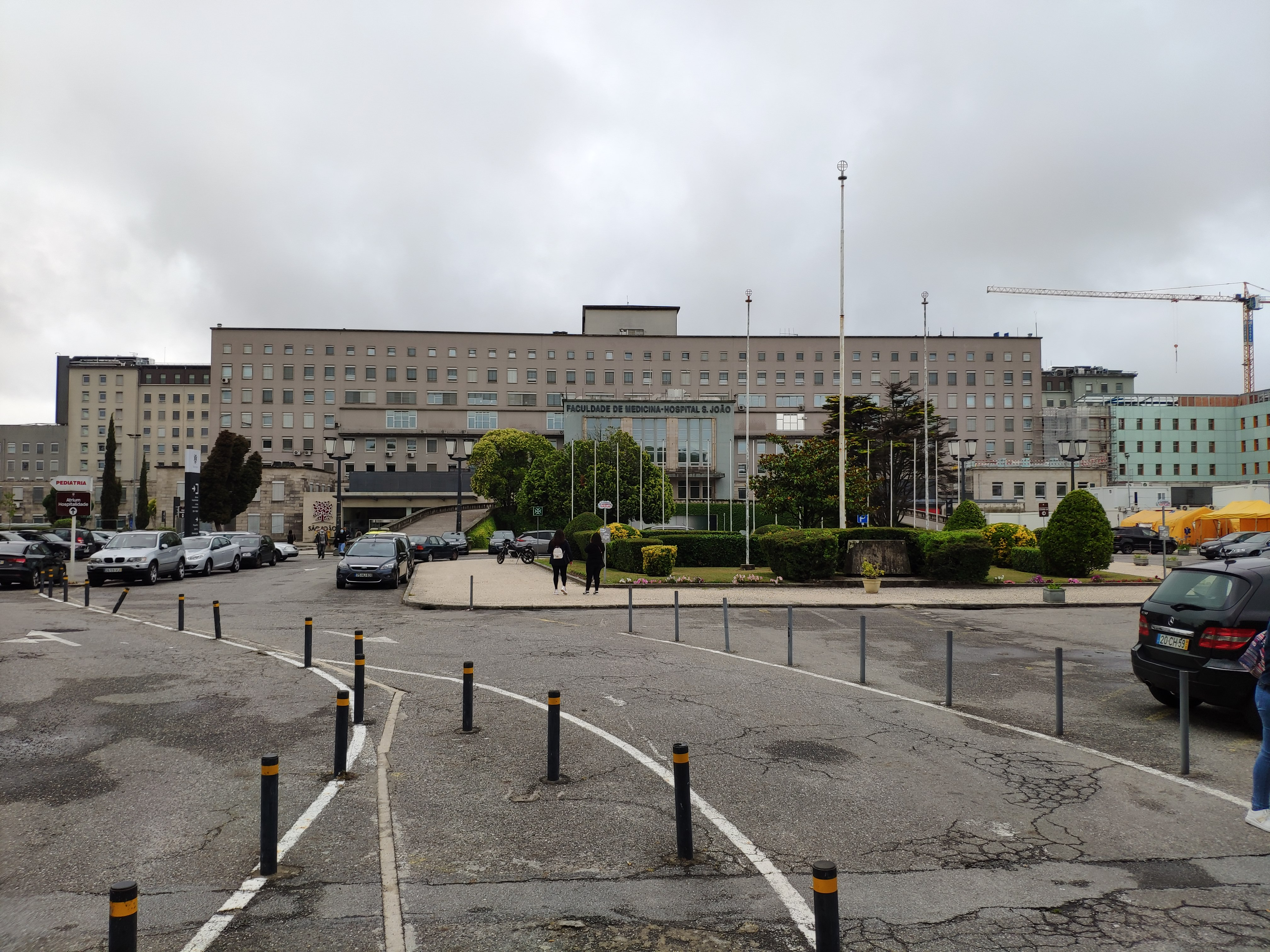

Geography
- Location: Rua Dr. Roberto Frias 4200, Porto, Portugal
- Coordinates: 41.1815°N 8.6010°W

Organisation
- Affiliated university: University of Porto

Services
- Beds: 1100

Helipads
- Helipad: Yes

History
- Opened: 24 July 1959

Links
- Website: https://portal-chsj.min-saude.pt/

The University Hospital of São João (in Portuguese Centro Hospitalar Universitário de São João, abbreviated CHUSJ), or simply São João Hospital, is the biggest hospital in Northern Portugal and one of the biggest in Portugal. The hospital is named after John the Baptist, São João in Portuguese and has been operating since 1959. Its main facilities are located in Paranhos, Porto, where it hosts a medical school, the Faculty of Medicine of the University of Porto. Additionally, it manages a secondary hub in Valongo.

The hospital provides direct medical care to the parishes of Bonfim, Paranhos, Campanhã e Aldoar, within the municipality of Porto, as well as to the neighbouring municipalities of Maia and Valongo. It also serves as a referral centre for the districts of Porto (except for Baião, Amarante and Marco de Canaveses), Braga and Viana do Castelo. Through the National Hospital Referral Network (Redes de Referenciação Hospitalar), it acts as a referral hospital for a broader geographic area of around 3.5 million people, particularly in highly specialised medical fields.

It has 1,100 beds and over 6,000 employees, including approximately 1,500 physicians and 2,300 nurses. The University Hospital of Sâo João accounts for 20% of public hospital care in northern Portugal and in a year it performs approximately 40,000 surgeries, 750,000 consultations, 127,000 treatment sessions and handles 250,000 emergencies.

== History ==
The origins of the São João Hospital are closely tied to the history of medical education in Porto. On 25 June 1825, King João VI issued a royal charter establishing the Royal School of Surgery of Porto (Régia Escola de Cirurgia do Porto) based at Santo António Hospital, then known as Hospital da Misericórdia. In 1836, as part of the educational reforms led by Passos Manuel, the school was renamed the Medical-Surgery School of Porto (Escola Médico-Cirúrgica do Porto). This period saw a significant emphasis on practical training, with the introduction of laboratories, specialised offices, and libraries, aimed at raising the quality of medical education. In 1883, the institution moved from the facilities within Santo António Hospital to a nearby building adapted to meet the growing demands of teaching and research.

The republican education reforms of 1911 transformed the Medical-Surgery School into the Faculty of Medicine of the University of Porto (Faculdade de Medicina da Universidade do Porto, or FMUP). This reform brought significant changes to the curriculum and clinical training. Core scientific subjects were introduced, and greater emphasis was placed on practical education through laboratory work and mandatory clinical internships.

Not long after its establishment, the Faculty of Medicine began facing limitations related to the building’s capacity and suitability for clinical teaching and research. Consequently, in July 1933, during the early days of the Estado Novo regime, António de Oliveira Salazar expressed the government's intention to build a teaching hospital in Porto.

The building of the São João Hospital was officially inaugurated on 24 July 1959 by Américo Tomás, coinciding with the Festa de São João do Porto. The hospital was designed as a university hospital, combining healthcare, teaching, and medical research under one institution. With its opening, the Faculty of Medicine relocated from its previous building to the new hospital facilities, while its former location became home to the Abel Salazar Biomedical Sciences Institute.

The hospital's installation committee was chaired by Hernâni Monteiro, anatomist and professor of the Faculty of Medicine. He gave the faculty’s inaugural lecture in the new building on 9 November 1959.

In 1984 the São João Hospital was made an honorary member of the Portuguese Order of Merit.

== Transports and access ==
The main facilities in Porto are located on the northern end of the city, by National Road 12 and nearby several major roadways, including highways A3 and A20. The area can be accessed by several types of public transportation. It is located at the northern terminus for Line D of Porto metro, which connects it to the city centre and Vila Nova de Gaia. The hospital is also serviced by a railway station, a part of the Linha de Leixões, connecting it to nearby localities, including Leça do Balio, São Mamede de Infesta and Campanhã. Lastly, several bus routes operated by STCP pass through the hospital.

Emergency services can arrive at the hospital via a helipad, which is directly connected to the emergency care facilities. This allows the hospital to reduce travel times and minimize risks when patients from other healthcare facilities are transferred.

In Valongo, the hospital's facilities are located in a central location, near National Road 15. The area is also serviced by suburban services running between Porto and Marco de Canaveses on the Linha do Douro. Several STCP bus routes also service the area.

== See also ==
- Official website
- Doctor Hernâni Monteiro - Sigarra
