= Serras do Porto Park =

Protected landscape park in Portugal

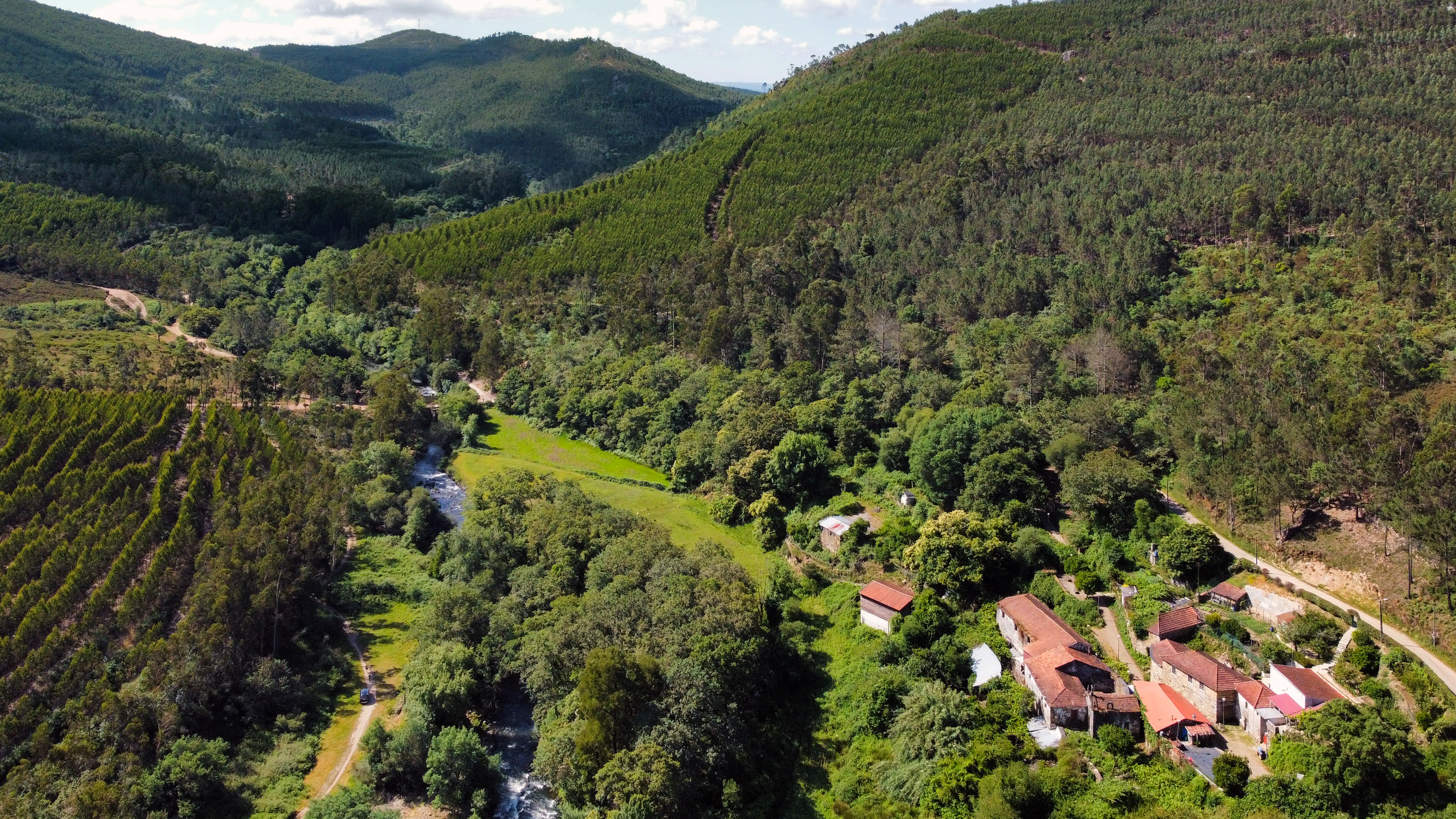
- Serras do Porto Park, in Valongo.
- Interactive map of Serras do Porto Park
- Type: Protected areas of Portugal
- Location: Porto metropolitan area, Portugal
- Coordinates: 41°7′22.6″N 8°26′37.2″W
- Area: 5,974 hectares (14,760 acres; 23.07 mi^{2}; 59.74 km^{2})
- Created: March 15, 2017
- Administrator: Associação de Municípios Parque das Serras do Porto
- Website: serrasdoporto.pt

The Serras do Porto Park (Portuguese: Parque das Serras do Porto) is situated in the Porto Metropolitan Area, encompassing territories within the municipalities of Gondomar, Paredes, and Valongo. It is classified as a regional protected landscape. Covering an area of 5,974 hectares, the park was established in 2017, serving as a green lung for the densely urbanized region of Porto and its surrounding municipalities, which together form the second most populous urban area in Portugal.

== Characterization ==
The Serras do Porto Park consists of a series of mountains located immediately east of the city of Porto, stretching in a northwest-southeast direction. These mountains are part of the Valongo anticline and contain some of the oldest geological formations in Portugal, dating back more than 540 million years.

The objectives behind the creation of this park were as follows:

- Conserving elements of biodiversity within the framework of landscape enhancement;
- Maintaining or restoring landscape patterns and the ecological processes that support them, while promoting traditional land use practices, construction methods, and cultural expressions;
- Preserving and enhancing geological and cultural heritage;
- Encouraging initiatives that generate benefits for local communities through the production of goods or the provision of services.

== Background ==
The concept of creating a large green area to serve as the "lung" for the urban region encompassing the city of Porto and its surroundings dates back nearly a century.

In 1932, Ezequiel de Campos, in the Prólogo do Plano da Cidade do Porto (Prologue to the Porto City Plan), acknowledged the city's role as a regional center and advocated for coordination with neighboring municipalities to establish "recreational places." In 1940, architect Giovanni Muzio emphasized the importance of creating green spaces outside the city, further elaborating on this idea in his 1946 Anteplano Regional do Porto (Porto Regional Plan). However, it was Antão de Almeida Garrett who, in the Plano Regulador da Cidade do Porto (Regulatory Plan for the City of Porto — 1952), first explicitly identified the Valongo hills as the ideal location for establishing a regional reserve.

In 1975, the Porto Region Plan by Johnson Marshall and Costa Lobo proposed the creation of a regional park to "prevent urban areas from merging." This proposal was endorsed by the Valongo Municipal Assembly in 1978, aiming to establish the future Santa Justa-Serra da Boneca Natural Park. Six years later, biologist Nuno Gomes Oliveira developed the Santa Justa, Pias, and Castiçal Mountains Nature Reserve Project, suggesting that the mountains could serve as “authentic laboratories for scientists and students, as well as spaces for culture and recreation for the public.”

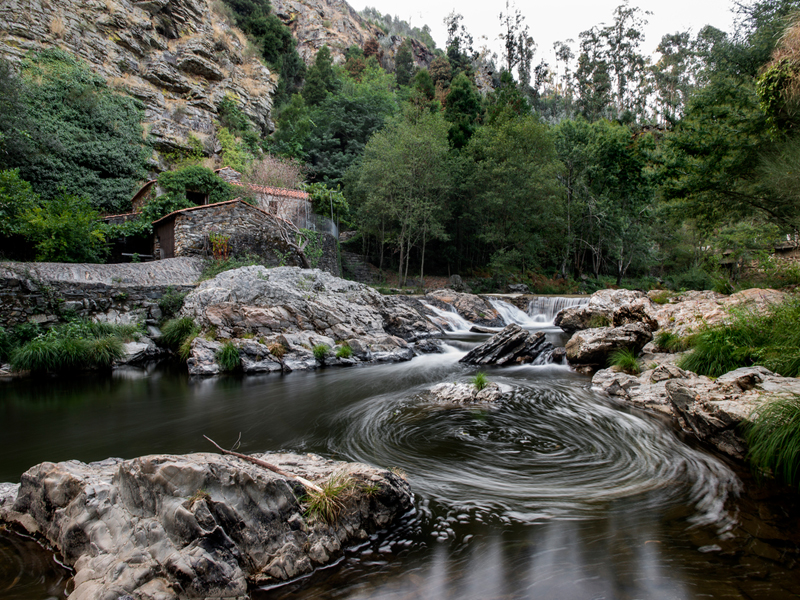
The Sousa River in the Serras do Porto Park.

In 1993, the area encompassing the Santa Justa, Pias, and Castiçal mountains was included in a proposal for a metropolitan park, envisioned as part of a structural ecological corridor. Its purpose was to serve as a green buffer and contribute to the environmental balance of the entire Porto Metropolitan Area ecosystem. In 2009, in the study Rede de Parques Metropolitanos na Grande Área Metropolitana do Porto, landscape architect Teresa Andresen proposed the creation of the Parque do Salto as part of the National Network of Protected Areas.

In 2014, under the Green Lung Project, the mayors of Gondomar, Paredes, and Valongo committed to forming an inter-municipal team composed of professionals from various fields, with Teresa Andresen invited to serve as the team's general coordinator. In June 2015, the three municipalities signed a cooperation agreement aimed at creating the Serras do Porto Park (Porto Mountains Park). The park would protect and enhance a territory comprising the Santa Justa, Pias, Castiçal, Flores, Santa Iria, and Banjas mountains, spanning 5,974 hectares of significant economic, cultural, and environmental value.

On April 18, 2016, at the São Pedro da Cova Mining Museum in Gondomar, the public deed establishing the Associação de Municípios Parque das Serras do Porto was signed. This organization led the process of classifying the territory as a protected area. The designation of the Serras do Porto Park Regional Protected Landscape was approved by the General Assembly in December 2016 and officially published in the Diário da República on March 15, 2017, marking the formal creation of the Serras do Porto Park.

== Geology and paleontology ==
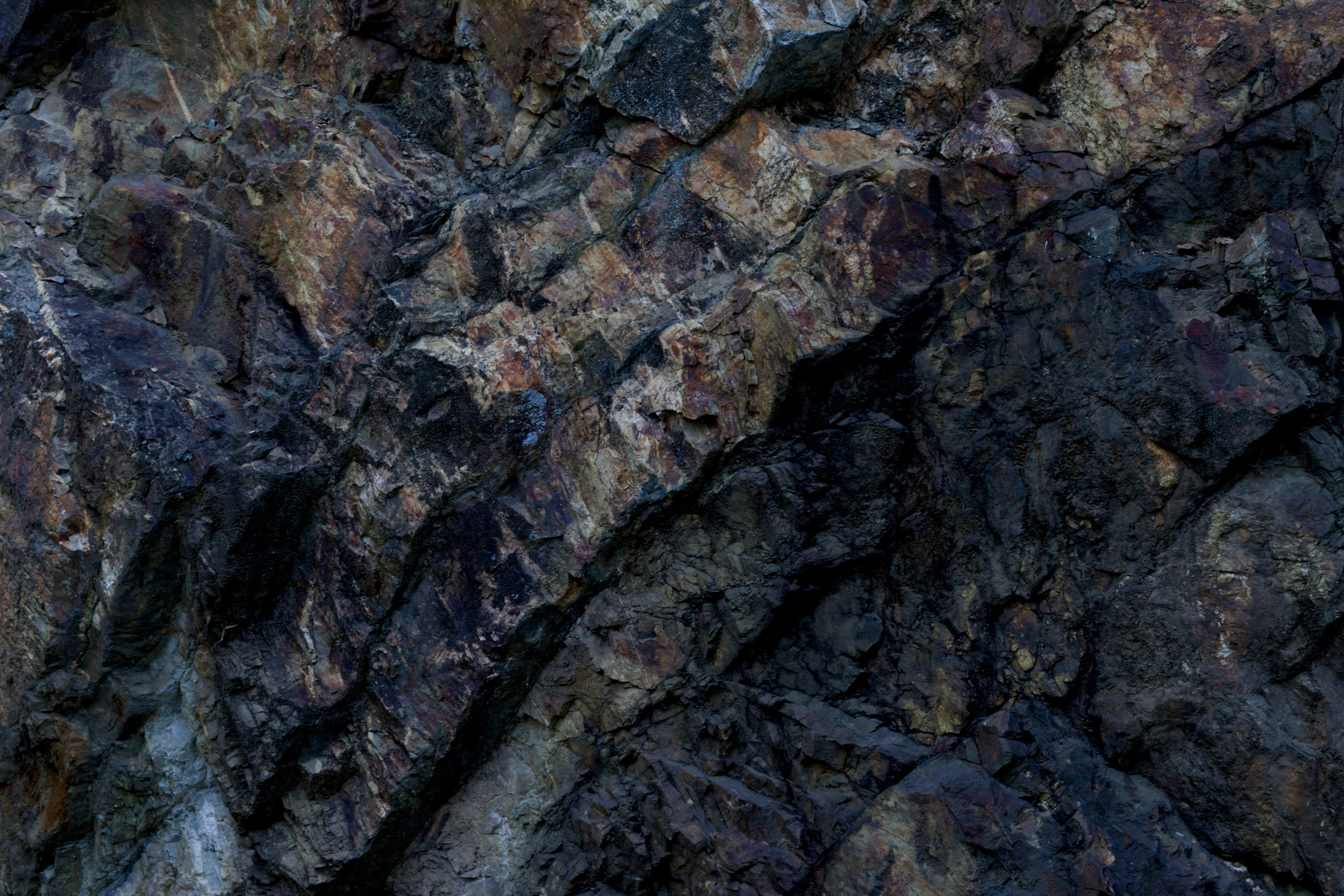
Quartzites in the Serra de Santa Justa.

The oldest rocks in the region were formed at the beginning of the Paleozoic era, more than 540 million years ago, when the area was submerged under the sea. Sediments deposited in the deeper parts of the sea transformed into shales, while quartzites, graywackes, and conglomerates formed from deposition in shallower areas.

At the beginning of the Ordovician period, a new sea formed in the interior of the continent, leading to the deposition of sediments that gave rise to the base conglomerates and quartzites of the Arenigian. These sediments formed the crests of the Valongo Anticline, located on both the western flank (Santa Justa, Castiçal, and Flores mountains) and the eastern flank (Pias, Santa Iria, and Banjas mountains), as well as the slates found in the region.

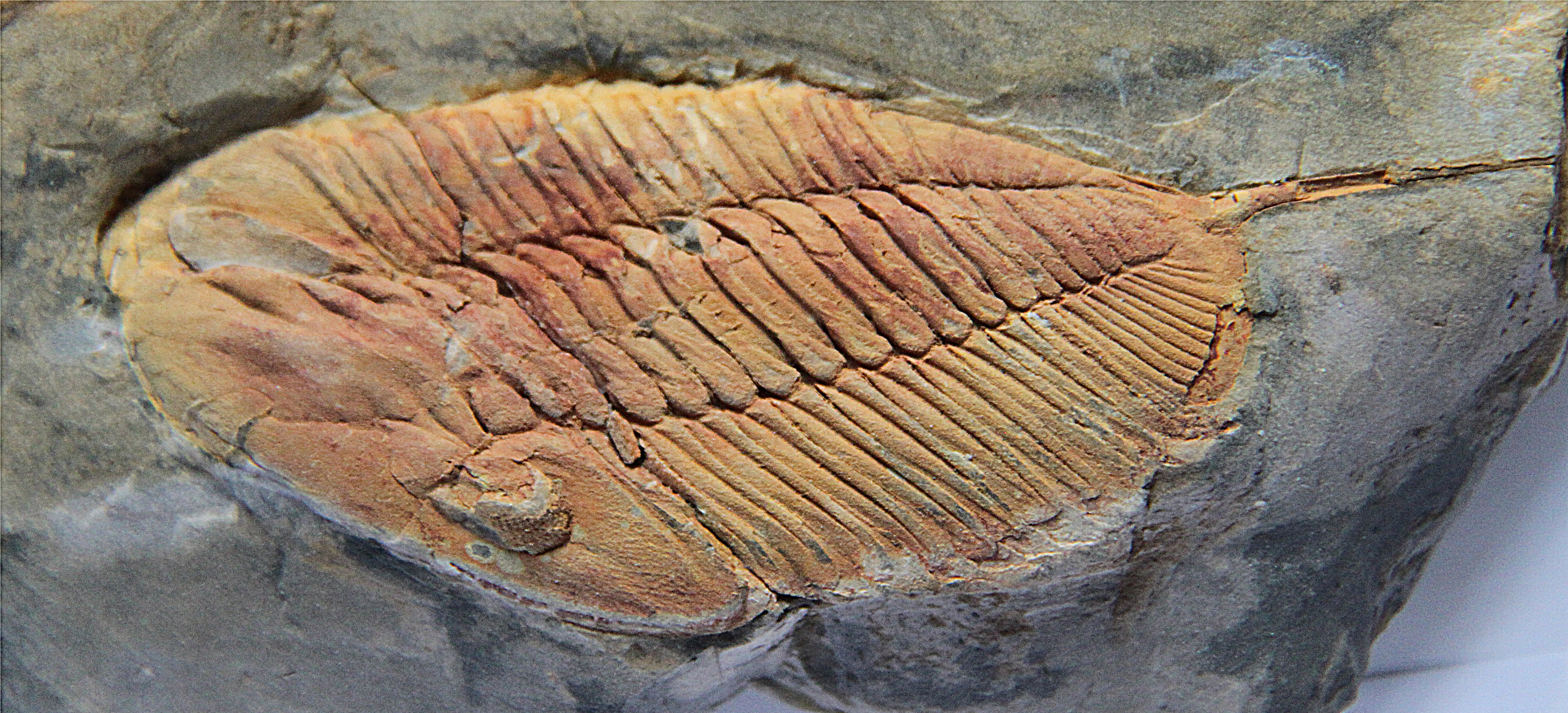
Trilobite fossil.

At the end of the Ordovician period, with the drift of the continents, the region was located near the South Pole, and sediments with glacial characteristics were deposited. The extreme conditions led to the extinction of most life forms. The sea then retreated, and the last marine sediments were deposited during the Devonian period.

Around 350 million years ago, a collision between continents occurred, giving rise to the great fold that now stretches between Esposende and Castro Daire. Subsequently, a dense forest developed in what is now known as the Douro Carboniferous Basin.

Due to their complex geological history, the Serras do Porto preserve an important fossil collection, serving as evidence of the fauna and flora that have inhabited the region over the millennia. Among the diverse species found, the most notable are the trilobites, which reached their peak during the Ordovician period, the graptolites, which thrived in the Silurian period, and the brachiopods.

== Biology ==
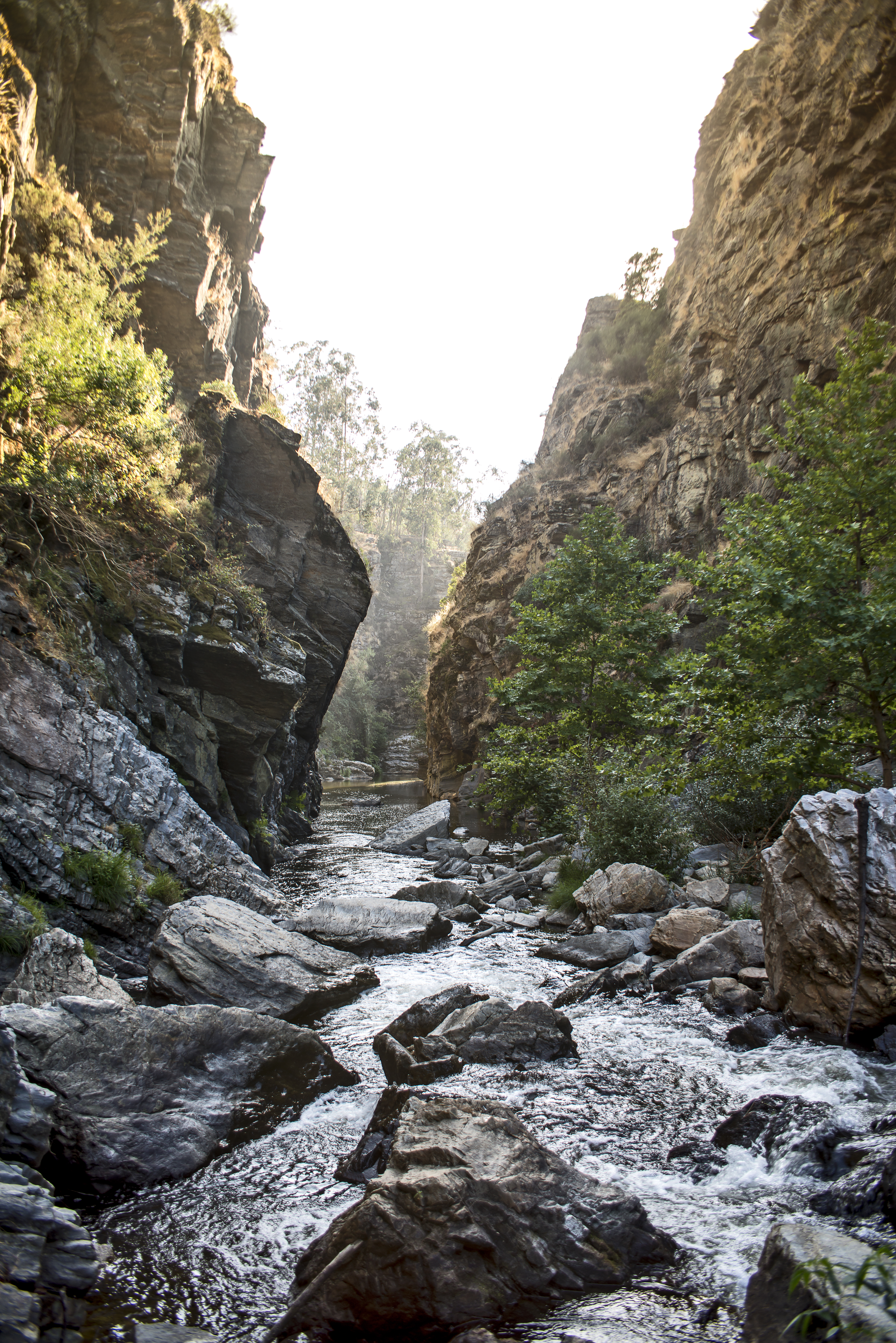
The Sousa River in the canyon of Senhora do Salto.

The characteristic forest of the region is primarily composed of oak groves, particularly Quercus robur, cork oaks, and various shrubs such as myrtle and puffin. It also includes riparian galleries along the watercourses, dominated by alders, black willows, and ash trees, along with numerous associated shrub species. On the slopes of the mountains, the most common native plant formations are undergrowth, featuring gorse, heather, and carqueja. In some areas, these evolve into scrubland, with broom, strawberry trees, and hawthorns, among others. Aromatic and medicinal plants, such as thyme and rosemary, are particularly prominent in the Banjas area. The laurel grove near Senhora do Salto also adds to the region's floral diversity.

The Serras do Porto are home to plant species that have garnered significant attention from the scientific community. It is the only known place in Europe where the species Culcita macrocarpa and Lycopodiella cernua are found. It is also the site of the only two populations of Trichomanes speciosum (film fern) in mainland Portugal. Other notable endemic species with restricted distribution include Dryopteris guanchica, Sucissa pinnatifida, Linkagrostis juressi, and the emblematic Narcissus cyclamineus (commonly known as hammerheads). Additionally, the relict fern Davallia canariensis and Silene marizii are present in the region.

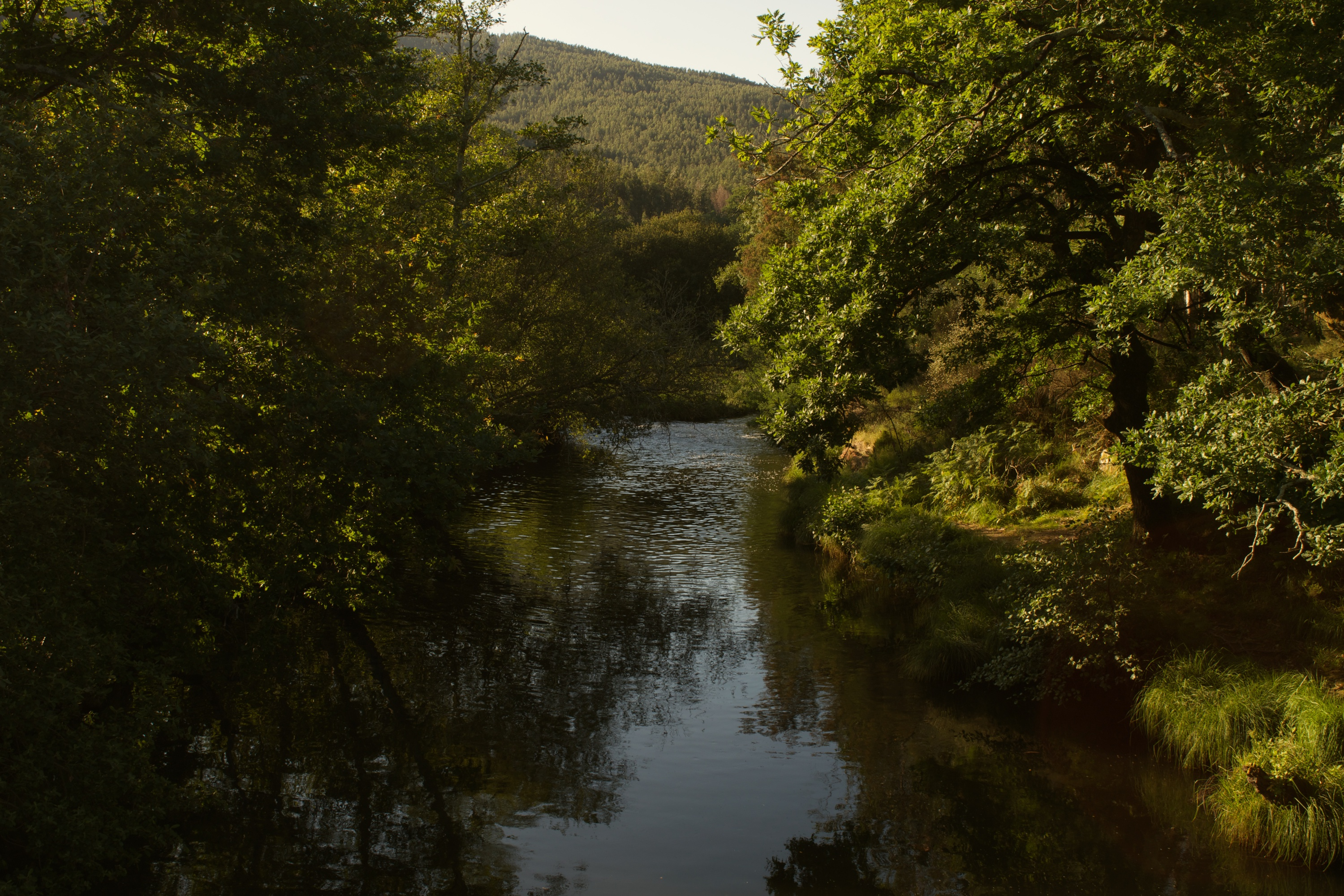
Ferreira River.

These mountains are home to a wide variety of wildlife, with particular conservation significance for the Lusitanian salamander (Chioglossa lusitanica). This amphibian, endemic to the northwest of the Iberian Peninsula, finds ideal conditions for breeding and metamorphosis in the mines resulting from Roman gold mining. The region's importance for the Lusitanian salamander, which is classified as vulnerable, led to its selection to appear on the logo of the Serras do Porto Park.

The peregrine falcon, kingfisher, woodlark, black kite, and dartford warbler also hold special EU protection under the Birds Directive, in addition to other species protected by the Habitats Directive. These include the spotted frog, Iberian frog, marbled newt, natterjack toad, horseshoe whip snake, Spanish pond turtle, iberian emerald lizard, eurasian otter, greater horseshoe bat, common bent-wing bat, pyrenean desman, Pseudochondrostoma duriense, bordalo, panjorca, red-tailed godwit, and, among invertebrates, the blond goat and dragonflies with the scientific names Gomphus graslinii, Macromia splendens, and Oxygastra curtisii.

Many other species of fauna further enrich the biological heritage, emphasizing the importance of the Serras do Porto as a refuge for wildlife in this metropolitan region.

== Human presence ==
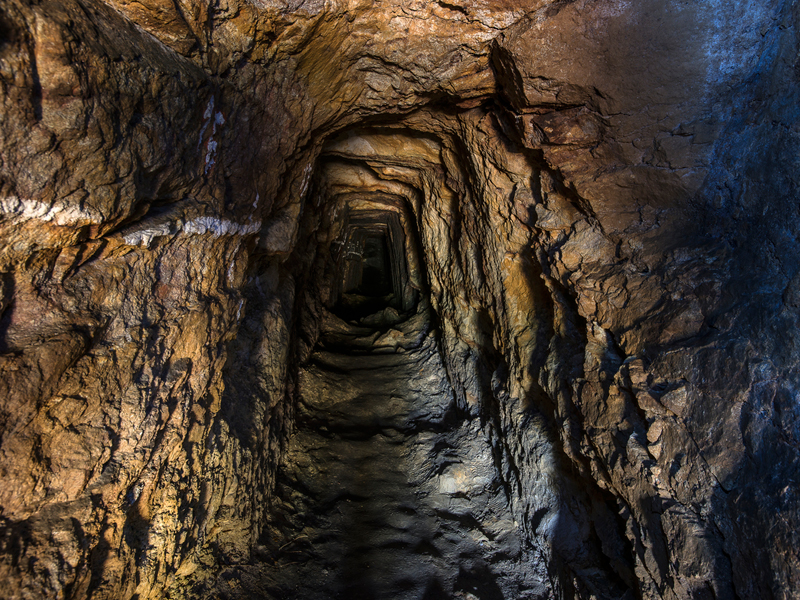
Gallery of a former gold mine.

Archaeological evidence shows that humans have inhabited the territory of the Serras do Porto for more than six thousand years, due to the abundance of natural resources and the favorable conditions for defense. In addition to evidence of the use of natural shelters as habitats by humans in their hunter-gatherer phase, megalithic monuments confirm the presence of people in the area during the Neolithic period. In the following millennia, the high points of the region were occupied by hill forts, providing visual control and dominance over the main waterways, including the valleys of the Sousa and Ferreira rivers, as well as the banks of the Douro River.

Across the park, there are mining works related to gold extraction during Roman times, including open cuttings and underground galleries, and quadrangular shafts. The popular terms fojos (to the north) and banjas (to the south) refer to the open-pit mines, typically narrow and deep, which are characteristic of ancient mining operations and are now widespread throughout the mountains.

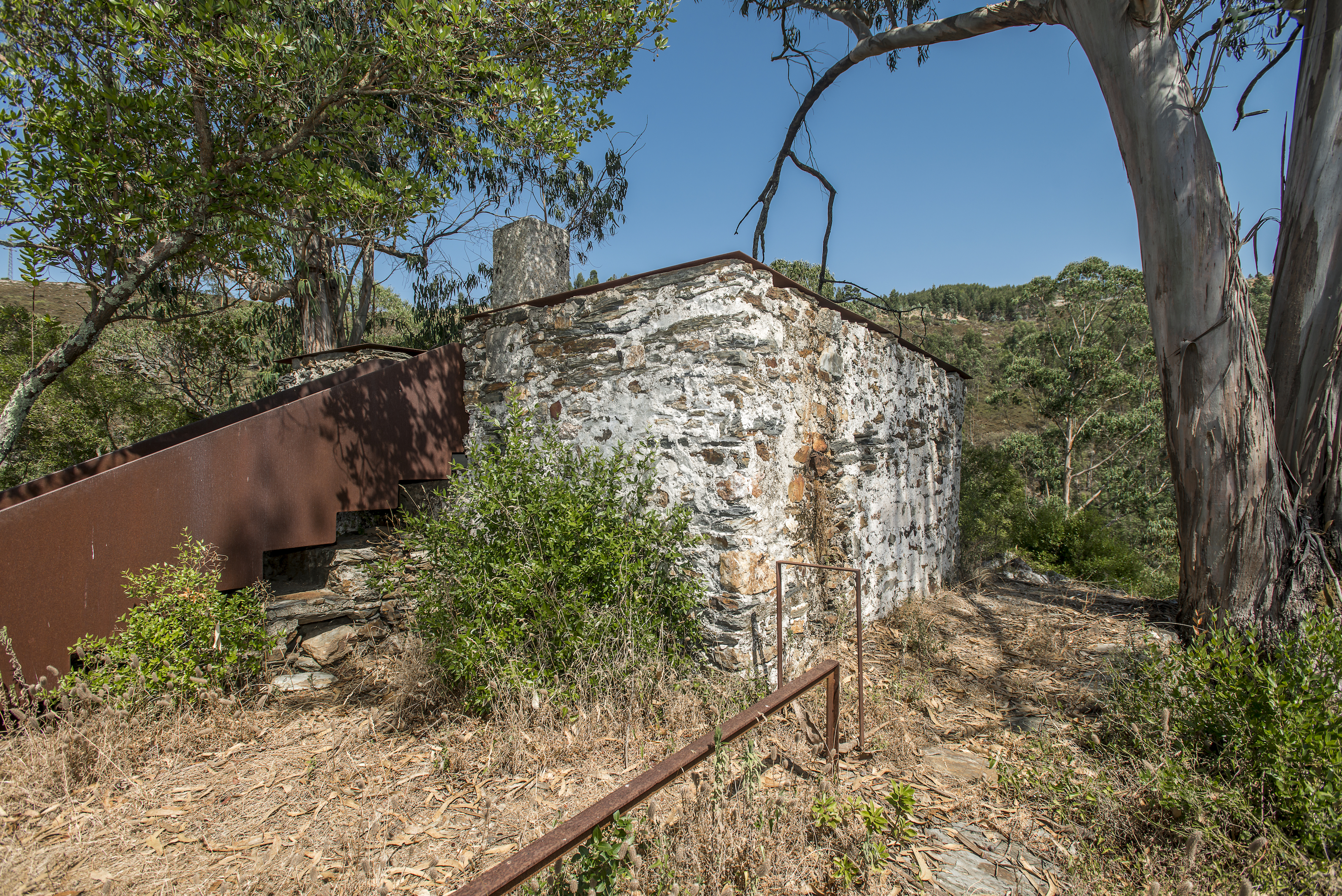
Ruins of the Aguiar de Sousa Castle Tower.

During the time of the Reconquista, particularly between the 9th and 11th centuries, the Aguiar de Sousa Castle Tower played an important role as a fortified site of strategic significance on the border between the territories of Anégia and Portucale. In the 13th century, it became the seat of the Aguiar de Sousa judicature.

The formation of parishes in the Middle Ages played a key role in the reorganization and settlement of the territory, with the construction of Christian temples, some of which became pilgrimage sites. The strong popular religiosity is also evident in the proliferation of crosses and alminhas.

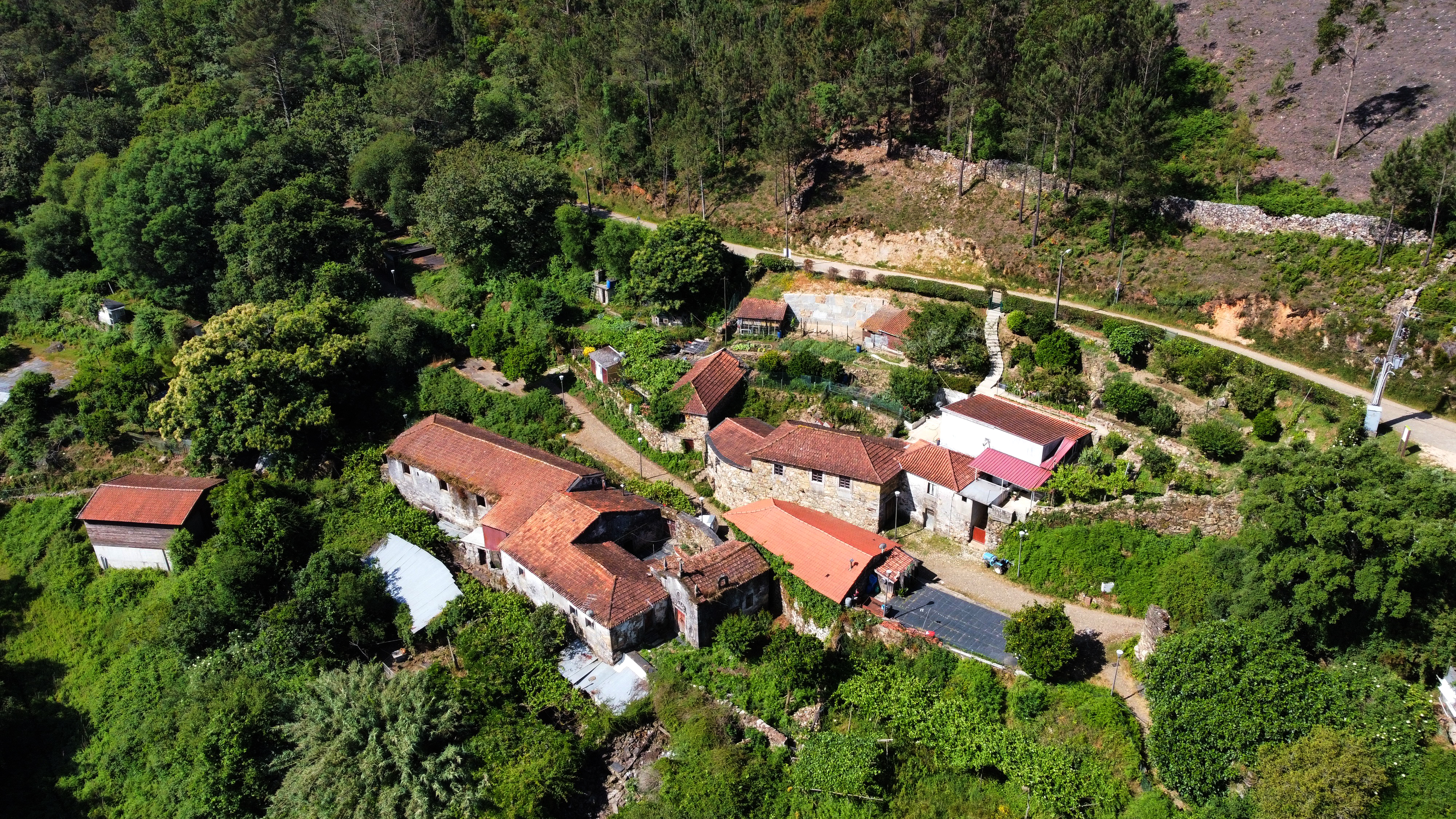
Village of Couce.

The agricultural tradition is particularly visible in the popular architecture found throughout the park area, such as the houses, granaries, hydraulic mills, and their weirs, which mark the end of the cereal production cycle. The construction of these mills dates back to the Middle Ages, and they are mentioned in the Afonsinas Inquiries of 1258, as well as in the Manueline foral of the 16th century, laying the foundations for contemporary baking practices.

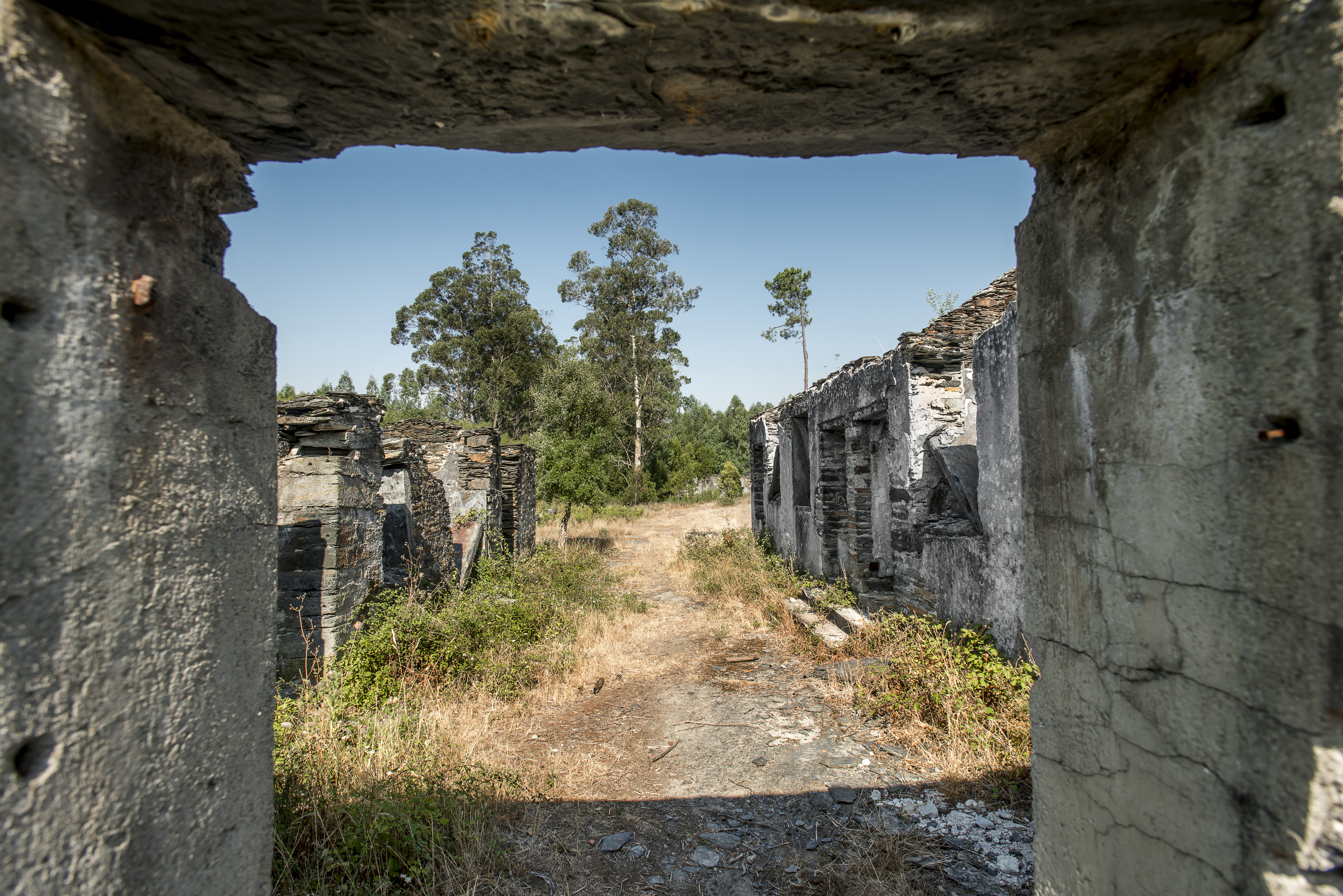
Ruins of Couto Mineiro das Banjas, Sobreira.

As a result of abundant mineral deposits, the Serras do Porto are home to an important industrial mining heritage, reflected in a vast array of ruined structures related to ore management and processing. In addition to gold, which was extensively exploited by the Romans, antimony was mined between the mid-19th century and the early 1970s. Coal was also mined in the region from the late 18th century until 1994. Slate mining dates back to 1865, with several companies still in operation today. Tin, tungsten, lead, zinc, and silver were also mined at various points throughout history.

The territory that now forms the Serras do Porto Park is also rich in oral traditions, featuring legends that blend memories (both real and fanciful) of battles between Moors and Christians, witches, enchanted Moors, lost treasures, nature, mountains, and rivers. One such legend is that of Senhora do Salto, which tells the story of a knight who, while chasing a hare, encounters a precipice. However, by invoking the protection of Our Lady, he is miraculously saved from falling. Today, the giant's feet visible in the bed of the Sousa River are known as the horse's footprints.

== Threats ==
=== Evolution of land use ===
Since ancient times, the tree formations in the area that now makes up the Serras do Porto Park have been dominated by oak (Quercus robur), a period when pastoralism and the collection of undergrowth (for agriculture, animal bedding, and baking ovens) were the predominant activities. However, from the 1970s onwards, the combined effects of the abandonment of agricultural practices, reduced use of these areas by the population, and the introduction of successive public programs to support afforestation led to a drastic transformation in land use. In 1981, the previously rare dominant stands of pure and mixed maritime pine occupied 55% of the area that now forms the park, with eucalyptus covering 4%. Nine years later, the pine forest had been reduced to 11%, with pure or mixed eucalyptus now prevailing.

Official data from 2017 showed that 4,129 hectares, or 69% of the park's total area, consisted of eucalyptus trees in various forms (pure and mixed with hardwoods or conifers), with other species now having a reduced presence, particularly native oak forests, which are now limited to small clusters. More recently, various initiatives have been developed to replace eucalyptus with native forest species, particularly oaks and cork oaks. However, these efforts still seem far from reversing the dominance of eucalyptus in the landscape.

=== Eucalyptus and forest fires ===
Occupying almost 70% of the area of Serras do Porto Park, eucalyptus is a fast-growing species primarily dedicated to the production of wood for pulp. Currently, 25% of the park's private land is managed by the Navigator company (formerly Portucel). However, in addition to the eucalyptus groves professionally managed by pulp companies, there is another area where eucalyptus predominates mainly due to its natural ability to proliferate, and its exploitation is linked to fire cycles, with felling occurring after each fire. However, since the fire cycle is too short (6 years), it does not allow for the production of woody material of economic interest. Besides the lack of economic viability, these vast areas are the main sources of high-intensity forest fires, which are harder to control, posing a danger to both the park's flora and fauna as well as to the people living nearby.

=== Invasive species ===
In recent decades, several exotic woody invasive species have proliferated, including those from Australia (Acacia melanoxylon), mimosa (Acacia dealbata), hawthorn (Hakea sericea), and willow-leaf hawthorn (Hakea salicifolia). Among the non-woody species, pampas grass (Cortaderia selloana) is notable. Particularly difficult to control are mimosa, cortadeira, and hakea, with hakea being especially problematic due to its high capacity for expansion, particularly through its association with fire.

=== Other threats ===
The uncontrolled dumping of rubble and the pollution of surface and groundwater caused by agricultural, industrial, and urban waste activities negatively impact the species of river fauna and riparian galleries. Unregulated visitation, improper harvesting of species, and off-road activities with motorized vehicles are other serious threats and contribute to the degradation of spaces (particularly the forest road network), with no positive benefits for the local community. Lastly, the A41 freeway, also known as the Circular Regional Exterior do Porto (CREP), which was completed in 2011 and runs through the park, has significantly altered the character of the Sousa Valley while greatly increasing accessibility to the park.

== Tourism ==
As the largest green infrastructure in a densely populated area like Greater Porto, the Serras do Porto Park regularly attracts many visitors. To accommodate them, there are three reception centers: São Pedro da Cova (Gondomar), Senhora do Salto (Paredes), and Santa Justa (Valongo).

Climbing, mountaineering, hiking, horse riding, mountain biking, and motorized sports are some of the activities promoted by associations, recreational clubs, and tourist and sports entertainment companies operating within the park. Particularly popular are environmental education and awareness sessions, as well as visits to villages and monuments, complemented by museums located near the park.

== Points of interest ==
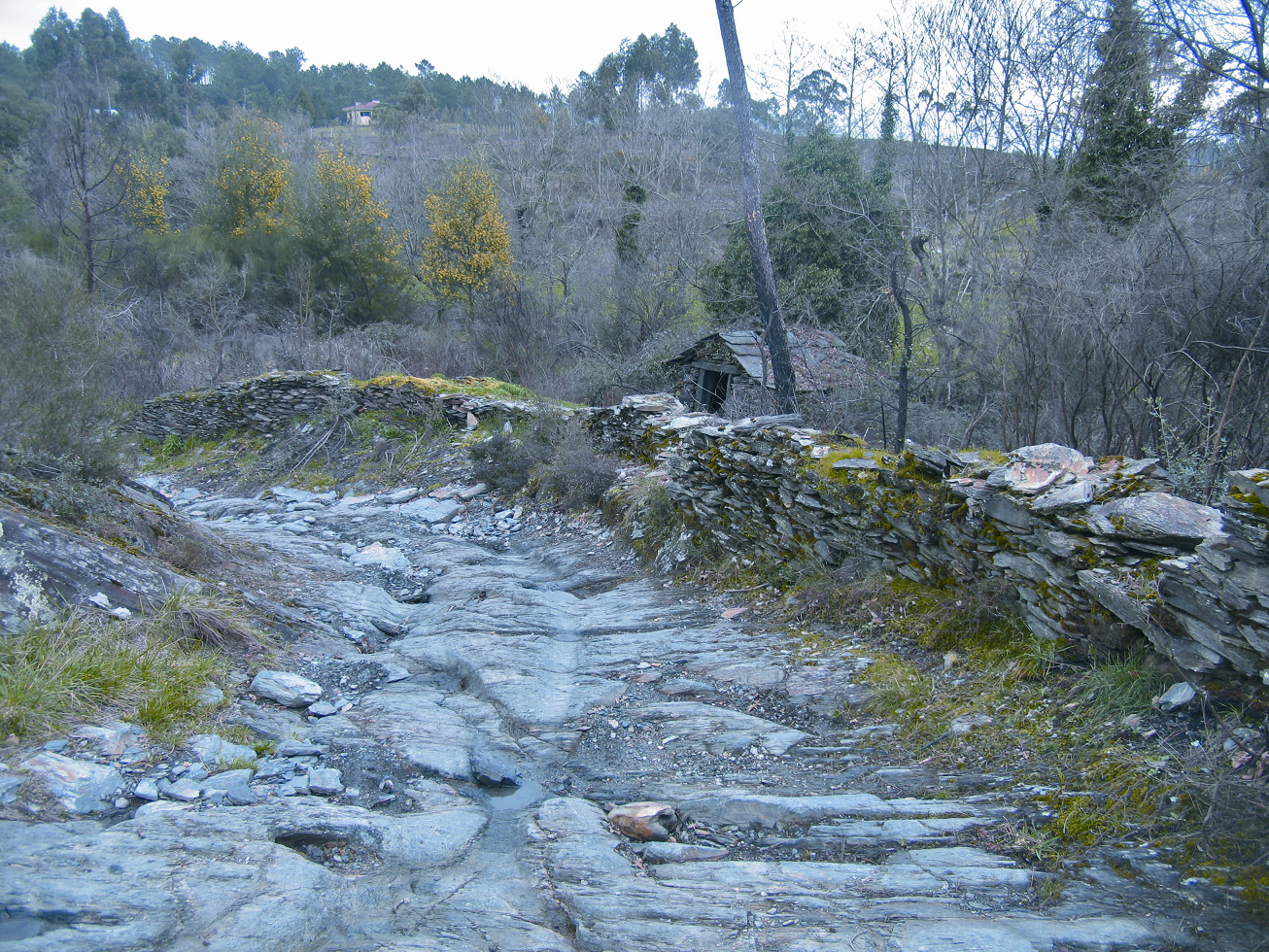
- Mill house, Banjas, Sobreira.
  Villages: Aguiar, Alvre, Brandião, Couce, Sarnada, Senande and Santa Comba;
- Chapels: Nossa Senhora do Salto, Santa Comba, Santa Isabel, São Sebastião, Santa Justa and São Sabino;
- Casa da Malta - São Pedro da Cova Mining Museum (nearby);
- Mill houses and weirs along the Ferreira and Sousa rivers;
- Casas de Pátio Fechado (Alvre);
- Environmental Interpretation Center, Santa Justa Reception Center;
- Senhora do Salto Interpretation Center;
- Castromil and Banjas Gold Mines Interpretation Cente;
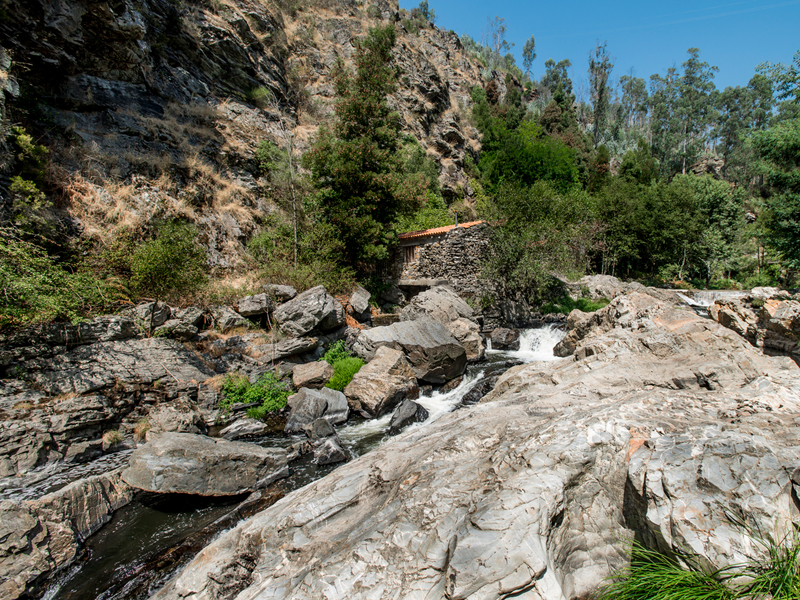
- Senhora do Salto Park.
  São Pedro da Cova Reception Center;
- Banjas Mining Complex;
- Church of São Romão;
- Mamoa de Brandião;
- Lousa Museum (nearby);
- Valongo Municipal Museum (nearby);
- Valongo City Park;
- Senhora do Salto Park;
- Santa Justa Leisure Park;
- Hiking trails: GR Serras do Porto; PR Corredor Ecológico; PR Trilho dos Romanos; PR Porto à Vista; PR Trilho dos Silveirinhos; PR Trilho de Alvre; PR Trilho de Belói; PR Trilho das Minas de Antimónio e Ouro; PR Trilho do Castelo;
- Aguiar de Sousa Castle Tower.

== See also ==
- Gondomar
- Valongo
- Paredes
