= Alfena =

- Civil parish
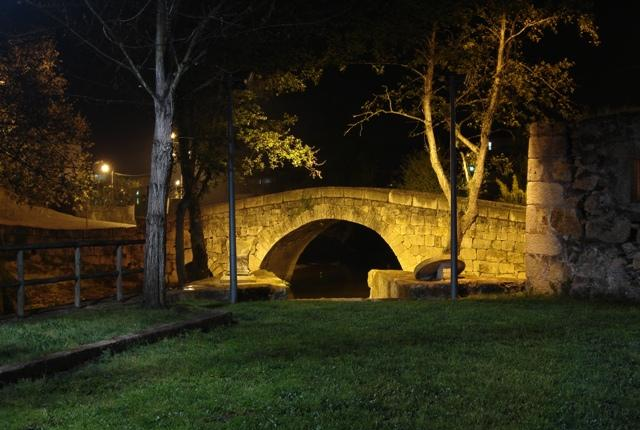

- Location in Portugal
- Coordinates: 41.238°N 8.525°W
- Country: Portugal
- Region: Norte
- Metropolitan area: Porto
- District: Porto
- Municipality: Valongo

Area
  - Total: 15.7 km^{2} (6.1 sq mi)

Population (2016)
  - Total: 18,130
  - Density: 1,150/km^{2} (2,990/sq mi)
- Time zone: UTC+00:00 (WET)
  - Summer (DST): UTC+01:00 (WEST)
- Website: http://www.freguesiadealfena.pt

Alfena is a Portuguese city and parish in the municipality of Valongo, Portugal. The population in 2010 was 18,130, in an area of 15.7 km^{2}.
