= Valongo (parish) =

- Civil parish
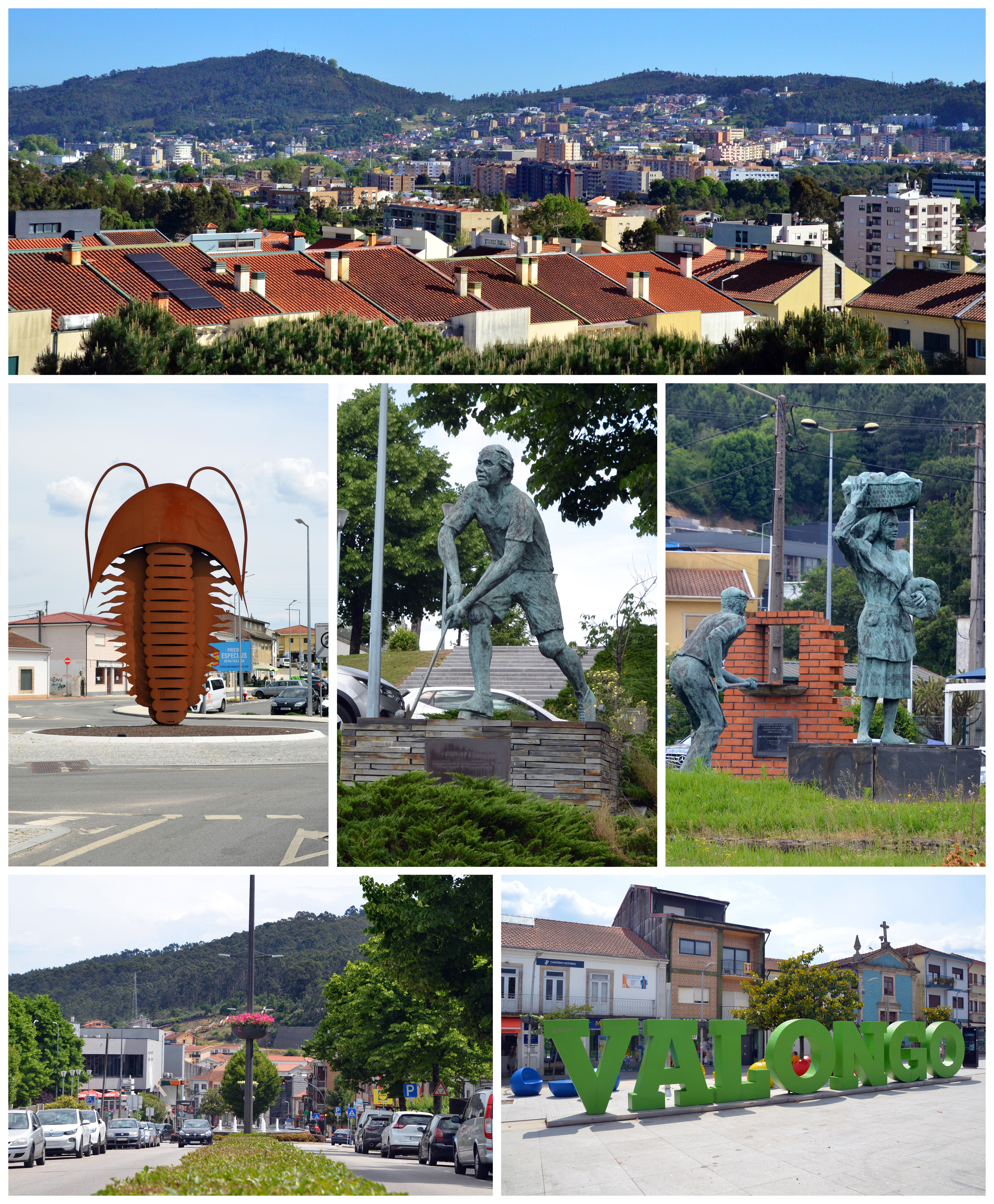
- From the top: Panorama of the parish; Trilobite Roundabout; Hockey player Statue; Monument in honor of the Bakers; 55h of October Avenue; Machado dos Santos Square

- Location in Portugal
- Coordinates: 41.191°N 8.498°W
- Country: Portugal
- Region: Norte
- Metropolitan area: Porto
- District: Porto
- Municipality: Valongo

Area
  - Total: 20.24 km^{2} (7.81 sq mi)

Population (2021)
  - Total: 25,882
  - Density: 1,279/km^{2} (3,312/sq mi)
- Time zone: UTC+00:00 (WET)
  - Summer (DST): UTC+01:00 (WEST)

Valongo is a civil parish in the municipality (concelho) of Valongo, in continental Portugal. The population in 2021 was 25882, in an area of 20.24 km^{2}.

Valongo is most famous for its mountains and its bread.
