= Lagares (Penafiel) =

Coordinates: 41.124°N 8.370°W

Lagares is former civil parish in the municipality of Penafiel, Portugal. In 2013, the parish merged into the new parish Lagares e Figueira.

Lagares is a village with an area of 10.92 km². It is located in the west of the country in the east part of the distrito (district) of Porto. Lagares is located nearly 30 km from the Atlantic. The population of the village is 2463 inhabitants. One of its major tourist attractions is Aldeia de Quintadona.
