= Hélder Ferreira =

Hélder Ferreira may refer to:

- Hélder Maurílio (Hélder Maurílio da Silva Ferreira, born 1988), Brazilian football defender
- Hélder Ferreira (footballer, born 1997), Portuguese football winger
- Hélder Ferreira (footballer, born 1980), Portuguese football central midfielder
