= Igreja de São Gens de Boelhe =

Church in Penafiel, Portugal

Coordinates: 41.135045°N 8.242619°W

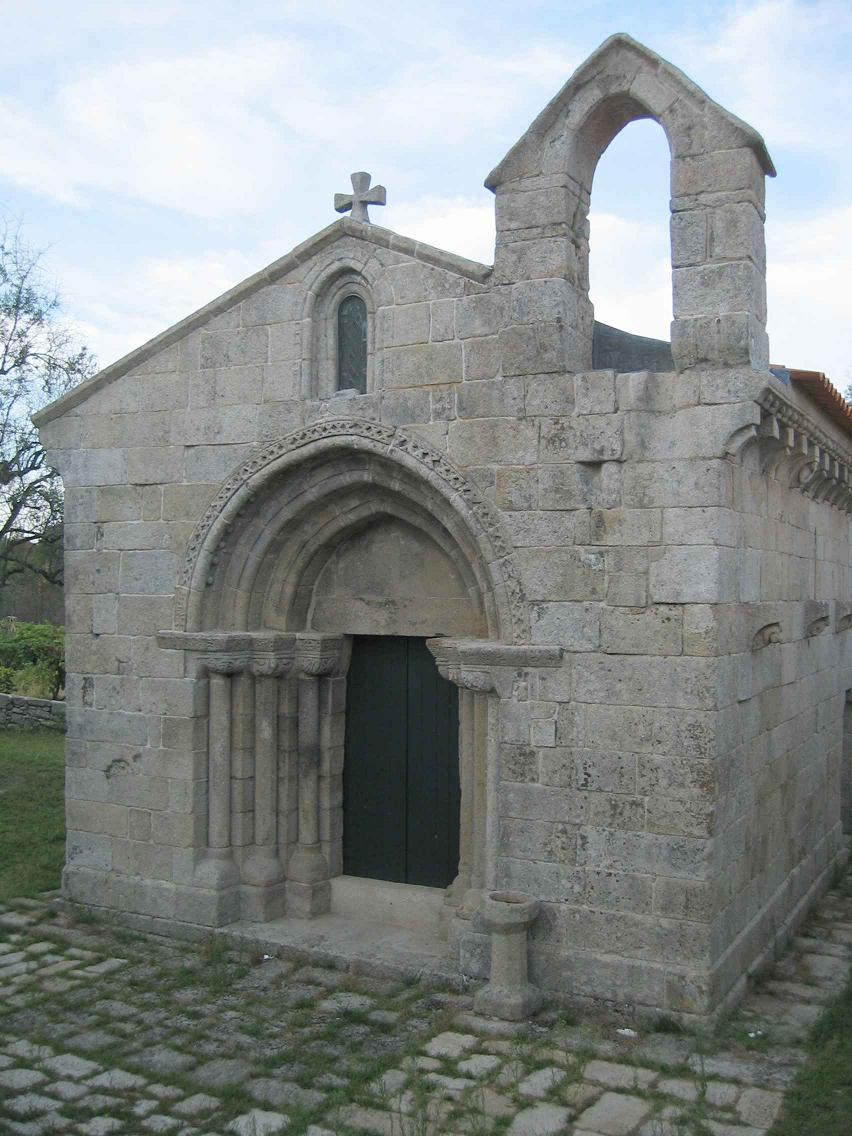
Boelhe S. Gens

Igreja de São Gens de Boelhe is a church in Penafiel, Portugal. It is classified as a National Monument.
