= Church of the Santa Casa da Misericórdia (Penafiel) =

- Church of Our Lady of Mercy
- Igreja da Santa Casa da Misericórdia
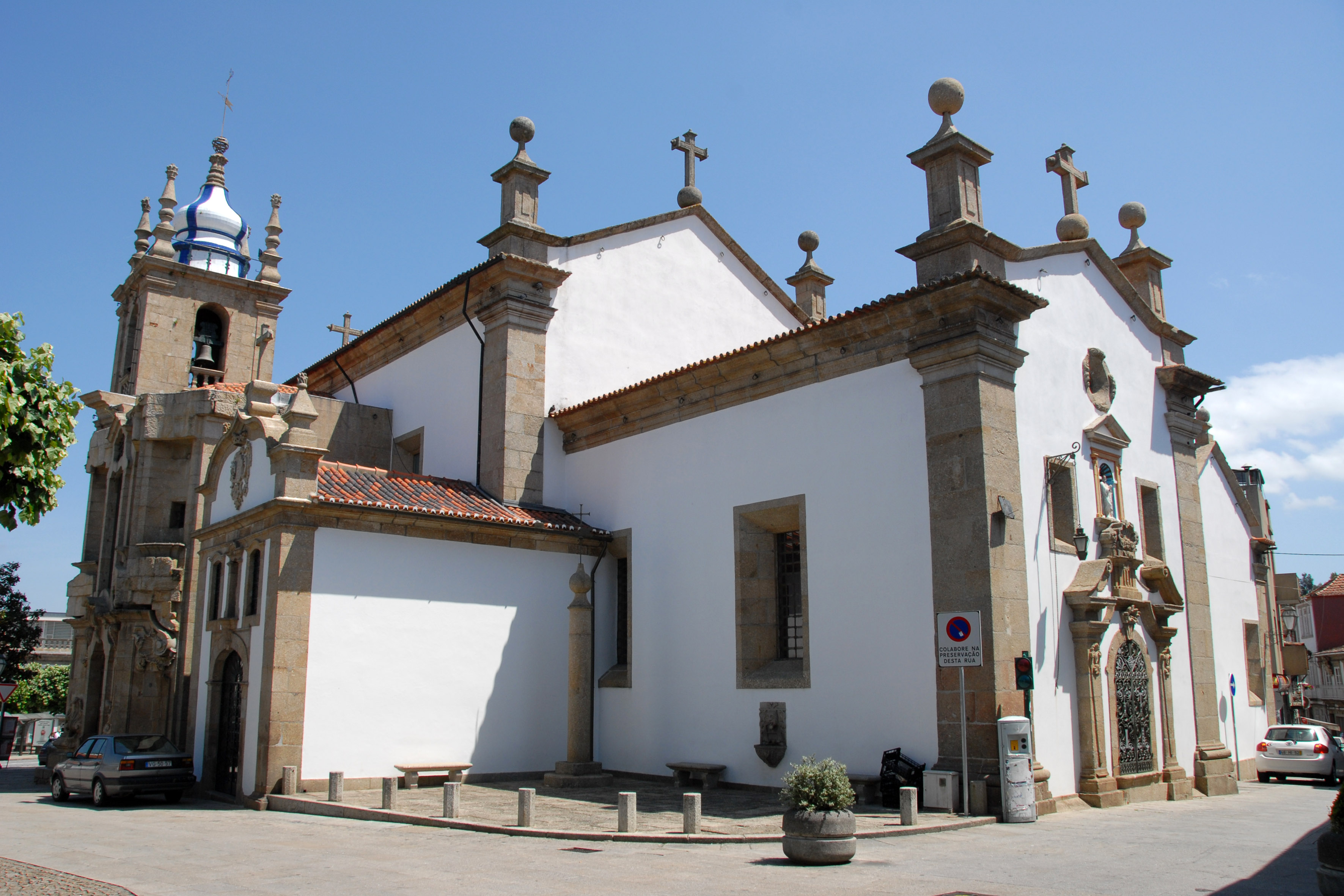
- An oblique view of the entranceway to the Penafiel Church of the Santa Casa da Misericórdia
- Church of the Santa Casa da Misericórdia
- Location: Porto, Tâmega, Norte
- Country: Portugal

Architecture
- Style: Mannerist, Baroque, Neoclassical architecture
- Years built: 17th Century

A Church of the Santa Casa da Misericórdia (Portuguese: Edifício e Igreja da Santa Casa da Misericórdia de Penafiel/Museu de Arte Sacra da Misericórdia de Penafiel), sometime referred to as the Church of Our Lady of Mercy, is a 17th-century church in the civil parish of Penafiel, in the municipality of the same name, in the Portuguese district of Porto.

== History ==
In 1621, the construction on the main altar began, due to the initiative of patron Amaro Moreira, abbey of the Church of São Vicente de Ermelo (who was later buried in the presbytery. By 1625, work had extended into the main church. The church was ultimately completed in 1631.

In 1741, Penafiel ascended to status of town, by decree of King D. John V.

Following the 1 November 1755 earthquake, the chapterhouse was damaged along the north wall, and was immediately rebuilt.

In the 22 April 1758 Memórias Paroquiais, signed by the co-adjunct José Carneiro Soares, the church was referred to as being founded by Amaro de Meireles, abbey of Armelo, donating 2000 portions of bread. The administrative council was responsible for supporting a capital of 200,000 cruzados. The hospital, administrated by the Santa Casa da Misericórdia, sheltered pilgrims and was the home to an image of Santo Cristo.

In 1764, the construction of a new facade was undertaken, addorsed to the southern facade, oriented towards the municipal palace/hall. But, five years later, there was a lack of funds and some conflict between the political authorities and the Santa Casa, resulting in an interruption in the construction.

On 1 June 1770, by papal bull, issued by Pope Clement XIV Penafiel was elevated to the status of city. From 1770, until 11 December 1778, the church functioned as the Sé Cathedral of the short-lived Diocese of Penafiel (1770–78), under the title of Bishop Don Friar Inácio de Caetano. It was only in 1780, though, that the conflicts between the municipal council and Misericórdia were resolved, but the public work was never concluded.

Between 1834 and 1850, the old organ from the Monastery of Bustelo was installed in the Misericórdia church.

In 2004, the church was inaugurated and reopened as a museological nucleus that included the church and annex spaces.

== Architecture ==
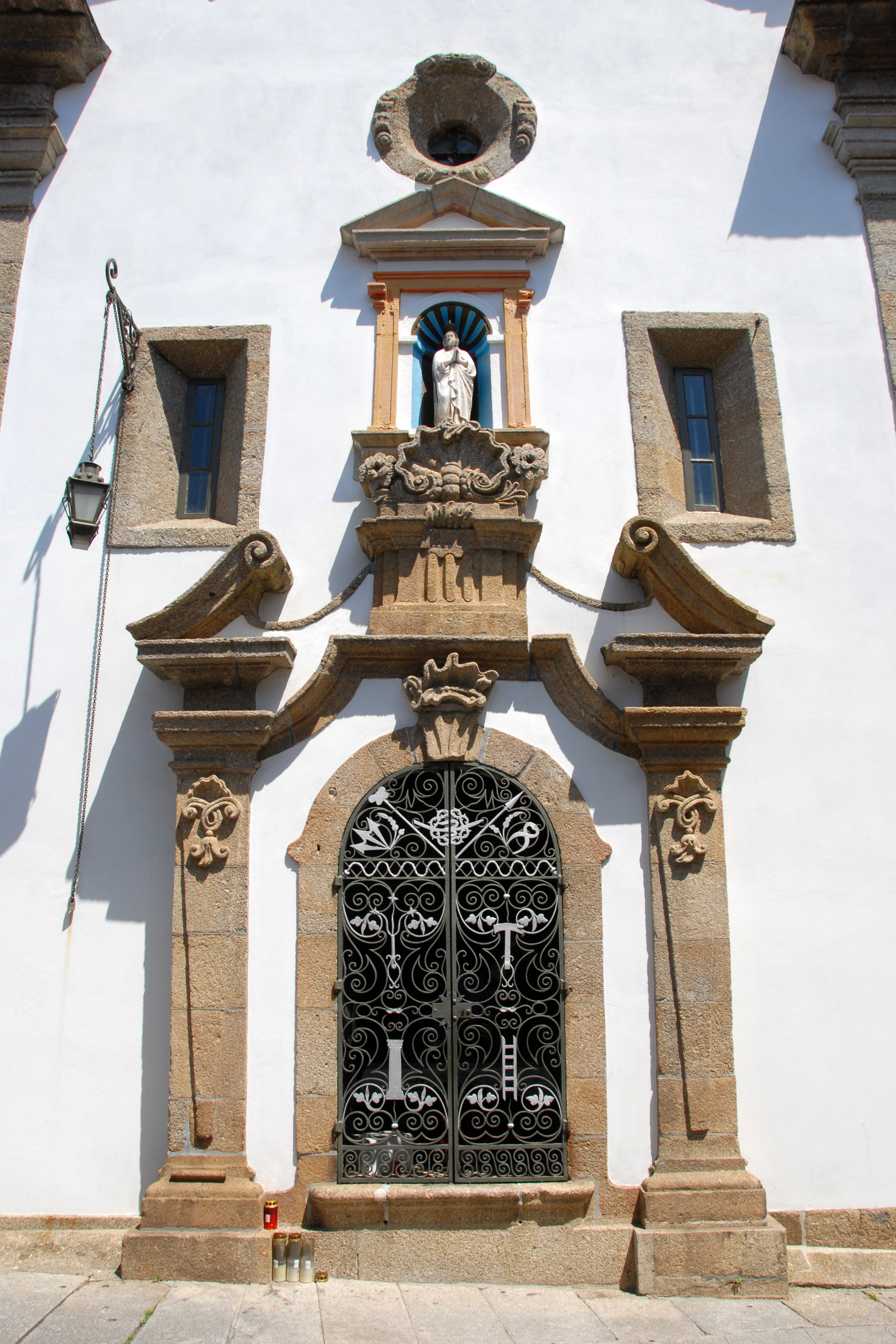
The front facade and portico of the Misericórdia

The church, located in the historic centre of Penafiel, is implanted in an accentuated square, with its front facade fronting the Largo Padre Américo and rear the Rua da Misericórdia. In the south it was flanked by tower and addorsed by the Centro de Convívio da Santa Casa da Misericórdia (Santa Casa da Misericórdia Conviviality Centre), and to the north the old house of the sacristan, that became the museum, resulting in its own block. Immediately in front is the municipal palace/hall.

The facade, conceived as an altarpiece, is bordered by pillars at the corners, accentuating the verticality. To the right is an 18th-century bell tower, that is surmounted by bulbous dome covered in tile. The interior is a single nave. The choir presents a monumental coffered ceiling.

The museum includes the main church, high choir, sacristy, reception hall and the old sacristan's residence, located between the sacristy and the presbytery. It is in this two-storey space, that the reception and beginning of public tours begin, marked by a great part of the public works.

== See also ==
- List of Catholic dioceses in Portugal
- Roman Catholicism in Portugal
- Our Lady of Mercy

== Sources ==
- Câmara Municipal, ed. (1945), Câmara Municipal de Penafiel (in Portuguese), Porto, Portugal: Imprensa Moderna, Lda.
- Guia de Portugal (in Portuguese), vol. 4 (IV/I ed.), Coimbra, Portugal, 1985
- Porto: do nome de Portugal (in Portuguese), Lisbon, Portugal, 1992
- Almeida, José António Ferreira de, Tesouros Artísticos de Portugal (in Portuguese), Lisbon, Portugal 1988
- Cepêda, Augusto Abreu Lopes (1990), A Misericórdia de Penafiel - a igreja e uma pintura antiga (in Portuguese), Penafiel, Portugal
- Valença, Manuel, A Arte Organística em Portugal, vol. II, Braga, 1990 (in Portuguese)
- IPPAR (ed.), Património Arquitectónico e Arqueológico Classificado, vol. II (in Portuguese), Lisbon, Portugal 1993
- Correia, F. da Silva, Origens e Formação das Misericórdias Portuguesas (in Portuguese), Lisbon, Portugal 1994
- Soeiro, Teresa, Cidades e Vilas de Portugal. Penafiel (in Portuguese), Lisbon, Portugal Editorial Presença, 1995, pp. 46-57
- Capela, José Viriato; Matos, Henrique; Borralheiro, Rogério (2000), As freguesias do Distrito do Porto nas Memórias Paroquiais de 1758 - Memórias, História e Património (in Portuguese), Braga, Portugal: Universidade do Minho
- Garcia, Isabel de Bessa, A clássica arquitectura de Penafiel. O caso da igreja da Misericórdia, CD Actas das Jornadas de Estudos as Misericórdias como Fontes Culturais e de Informação, Outubro de 2001, Penafiel, 2002 (in Portuguese)
- Filipe, Ana; Duarte, Artur Jaime; Malheiro, Miguel (2005), "Igreja da Misericórdia de Penafiel: Espaço museológico", Revista Monumentos (in Portuguese), Lisbon, Portugal, pp. 140–145
- A Intervenção no Património Práticas de Conservação e Reabilitação, FEUP e DGEMN (in Portuguese), vol. I, Porto, Portugal, 1 October 2005, pp. 141–157
