= Castro of Monte Mozinho =

Coordinates: 41.1464°N 8.3111°W

- Castro de Monte Mozinho
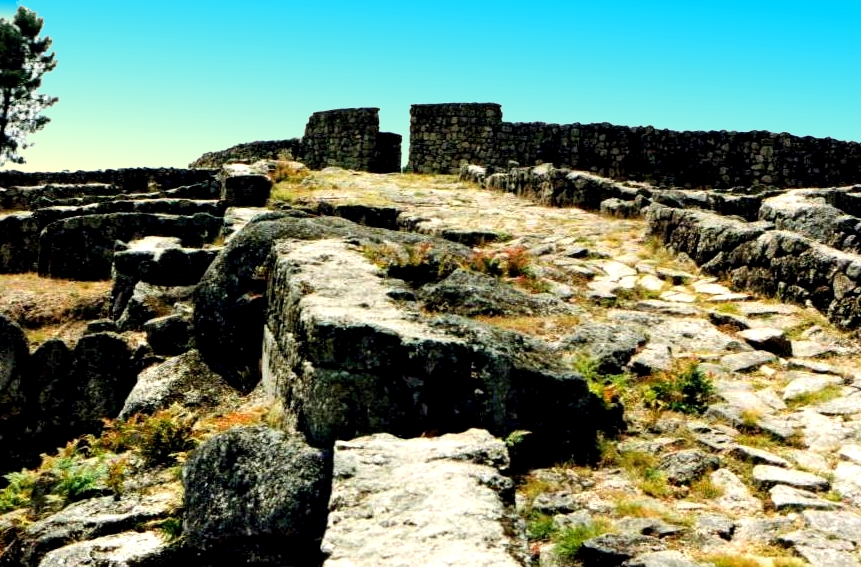
- A view at the top of the hill of Monte Mozinho
- Interactive map of the Castro of Monte Mozinho area

General information
- Type: Castro
- Architectural style: Calcolithic
- Location: Oldrões, Penafiel, Portugal
- Owner: Portuguese Republic

Technical details
- Material: Granite

The Castro of Monte Mozinho (Portuguese: Povoado fortificado de Monte Mozinho/Cidade Morta de Penafiel) is a Neolithic fortified settlement, sometimes referred to as the Dead City, situated in the civil parish of Oldrões, in the municipality of Penafiel in the Tâmega Subregion of the Portuguese district of Porto.

== History ==
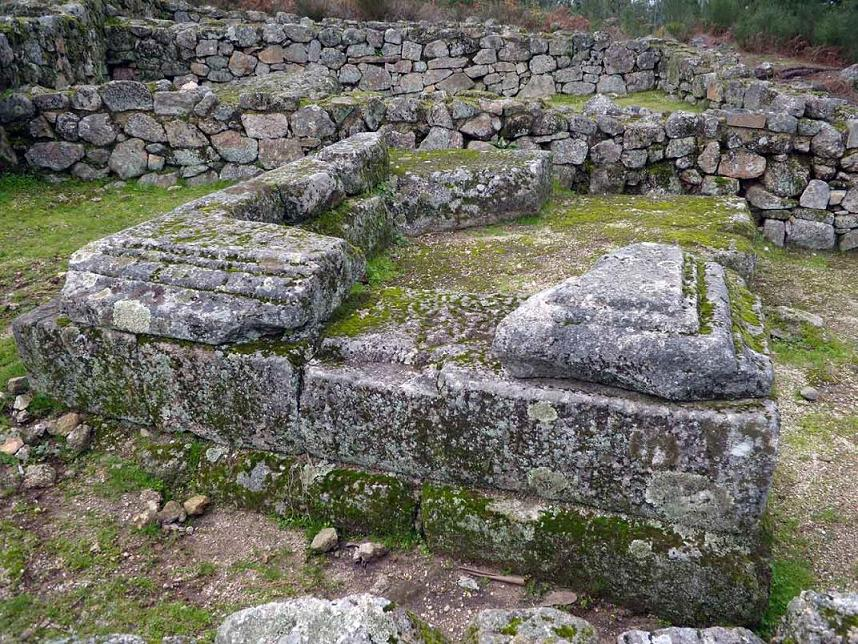
Roman temple ruins, 1st century, although the city is much earlier, Dead City

The site dates to a proto-historic period still largely undefined. Its first period of occupation can be traced to the 1 century BCE. Although with clear Roman structures, the original hillfort was flanked by statues of Gallaeci warriors, pointing to pre-Roman, Celtic settlements.

By the Middle Ages the site continued to be occupied by a small community.

On 8 November 2004, an interpretative centre was inaugurated by the Secretária de Estado das Artes e Espectáculos (Secretary-of-State for the Arts and Performances), Teresa Caeiro.

In 1930, archaeological excavations under the direction of Abílio Miranda. Excavations were continued in 1943, under the direction of Elísio Ferreira de Sousa, and in 1947, under the supervision of Fernando Russell Cortez.

Between 1974 and 1979, a new excavation was carried out by Carlos A. Ferreira de Almeida. A similar excavation began in 1982 (ending ten years later) by the archaeologist Teresa Soeiro.

The artefacts unearthed included fragments of ceramics dating to the Iron Age and Roman occupation, including pots, glass, Imbrex and tegula, millstones, coins and metallic elements (including artesanal, defensive and agricultural implements). In addition there were decorative jewellery in silver and bronze Transmontanan fibula (brooch), in addition to granite statuary and altars (an epigraph, fragment dedicated to Jupiter and another truncated to the foculus). These and other artefacts were housed and on display in the Museu Municipal de Penafiel (Penafiel Municipal Museum), Museu de Etnografia e História do Porto (Porto Museum of Ethnography and History) and the Museu de Antropologia da Universidade do Porto (University of Porto's Anthropologic Museum).

== Architecture ==
The fortified settlement was located in an isolated, rural hilltop covered in pine forest, overlooking the Ribeira da Camba. It is erected in the southern part of the municipality, between the parishes of Santo Estêvão de Oldrões and Galegos.

The castro covers an area of 20 hectares, defined by four lines of walls that encircle the settlement, at a maximum of 3.5 metres (11 ft) thick at the doorways. The settlement was structured by principal dwellings oriented north to south, articulated with lateral lodgings, aligned orthogonally.

Archaeological excavations completed during its history exhumed circular constructions, with or without vestibule, and rectangular plans, with habitational structures framed by dwellings and defined by the walls, forming blocks. Above the settlement is a vast ellipsoid courtyard, also defined by wall, presenting a space that could have acted as a public space.

Close to the upper courtyard and principal lodgings, accessible by a bent ramp, is a probable temple constituted by a rectangular cell and podium along the longest side and fronted by other rectangular constructions. In the third wall is a possible funerary monument, heavily ruined, but with a good foundation marked by a rectangular cavity conserved and framed by stones. It is a turriform mausoleum with columns and sculptures, and many elements lying around its base. To the northwest, near the outer wall was a necropolis made up of two sepulchral boxes structured with small stones, covered by slate, with shelf where ceramic containers were deposited.
