= Lagares e Figueira =

- Civil parish
- Location in Portugal
- Coordinates: 41.124°N 8.370°W
- Country: Portugal
- Region: Norte
- Intermunic. comm.: Tâmega e Sousa
- District: Porto
- Municipality: Penafiel

Area
  - Total: 16.64 km^{2} (6.42 sq mi)

Population (2011)
  - Total: 2,866
  - Density: 170/km^{2} (450/sq mi)
- Time zone: UTC+00:00 (WET)
  - Summer (DST): UTC+01:00 (WEST)

Lagares e Figueira is a civil parish in the municipality of Penafiel, Portugal. It was formed in 2013 by the merger of the former parishes Lagares and Figueira. The population in 2011 was 2,866, in an area of 16.64 km².
