= Abragão =

Coordinates: 41°09′N 8°13′W

Abragão is a parish of Penafiel, Portugal. The population in 2013 was 2,341 in an area of 9.5 km².
