= Rio Mau (Penafiel) =

- Civil parish
- Location in Portugal
- Coordinates: 41.053°N 8.367°W
- Country: Portugal
- Region: Norte
- Intermunic. comm.: Tâmega e Sousa
- District: Porto
- Municipality: Penafiel

Area
  - Total: 6.13 km^{2} (2.37 sq mi)

Population (2011)
  - Total: 1,407
  - Density: 230/km^{2} (594/sq mi)
- Time zone: UTC+00:00 (WET)
  - Summer (DST): UTC+01:00 (WEST)
- Website: http://www.jf-riomau.pt/

Rio Mau is a Portuguese parish located in the municipality of Penafiel. The population in 2011 was 1,407, in an area of 6.13 km^{2}. It was created in 1984 by Law nº 42/84, of December 31, with places disannexed from the parish of Sebolido.
