= Magikland (Portugal) =

Theme park in Portugal

Coordinates: 41.1994°N 8.2800°W

Magikland, known until 2011 as Bracalândia, is an amusement park located in Penafiel, northern Portugal. Originally (from 1990 to 2007), it was located in Braga, until the contract was expired and moved to Penafiel. There, it reopened in 2010 using the name Bracalândia for two seasons, but fell into administration in October 2011. It reopened in the 2012 season under new management and under its current name. It is one of Portugal's largest theme parks.

== History ==
Bracalândia was one of many urban development projects approved by mayor Mesquita Machado. When in Braga, both the municipality and its operator LusoParques held a day (in May) where primary school students visited it.

In May 2006, it was holding negotiations with the municipality of Braga to relocate to a new facility with the size of twelve hectares, more than double of the location it had been occupying since its inception. In November, it was announced that it would leave Braga from January 2008, when the contract expired; Mesquita Machado announced that it would not extend it. It was later announced that Bracalândia would move to Penafiel, however work would depend on local approval. Initially, the reopening would take place in mid-2008 while Braga would gain a new amusement part in another location. Bracalândia closed in Braga on 30 September 2007; once the equipments were relocated, work on the International Iberian Nanotechnology Laboratory in the park's former terrain would begin in January 2008.

After successive delays, the opening date was announced in September 2009, 13 March 2010.

On 21 October 2011, Bracalândia requested insolvency and announced its closure. It faced a dwindling number of visitors during its two seasons. It reopened under new administration as Magikland in June 2012.
