= Hélder Ferreira (footballer, born 1980) =

Portuguese footballer

Personal information
- Full name: Hélder Luís Moreira Ribeiro da Silva Ferreira
- Date of birth: 13 June 1980 (age 46)
- Place of birth: Penafiel, Portugal
- Height: 1.83 m (6 ft 0 in)
- Position: Defensive midfielder

Youth career
- 1991–1999: Penafiel

Senior career*
| Years | Team | Apps | (Gls) |
| 1999–2015 | Penafiel | 278 | (21) |
| 2000–2001 | → Tirsense (loan) | | |
| 2004–2006 | → Marco (loan) | 42 | (1) |
| Total | | 320 | (22) |

Managerial career
- 2015–2017: Penafiel (assistant)
- 2017–2018: Arouca (assistant)
- 2019: Cova Piedade (assistant)
- 2019–2020: Penafiel (assistant)
- 2020: Varzim (assistant)
- 2021: Cova Piedade (assistant)
- 2026: CFR Cluj (assistant)
- * Club domestic league appearances and goals

Hélder Luís Moreira Ribeiro da Silva Ferreira (born 13 June 1980) is a Portuguese former professional footballer who played as a defensive midfielder.

== Club career ==
Born in Penafiel, Porto District, Ferreira spent 13 of his 16 years as a professional with hometown club F.C. Penafiel, arriving in its youth system at the age of 11 and going on represent it in all three major levels of Portuguese football. He played his first official game with the first team on 14 May 2000, also scoring once in a 3–2 away win over S.C. Covilhã in the Segunda Liga.

After one season on loan to F.C. Tirsense in the lower leagues, Ferreira returned to the Estádio Municipal 25 de Abril, appearing in a further three second-division campaigns. In summer 2004, he joined F.C. Marco also in that tier.

Ferreira re-signed with Penafiel for a third spell in the 2006 off-season, where he remained until his retirement and also acted as captain. In 2014–15 he appeared with the side in the Primeira Liga, his first match in the competition occurring on 17 August 2014 (at the age of 34 years and two months) in a 1–3 home loss to C.F. Os Belenenses. He scored in a 3–2 defeat at Rio Ave F.C. on 27 October where he featured as a central defender, also putting one past his own net in the 2–1 away loss against F.C. Paços de Ferreira the following 8 February in an eventual relegation as last.
