= Penafiel =

- Municipality
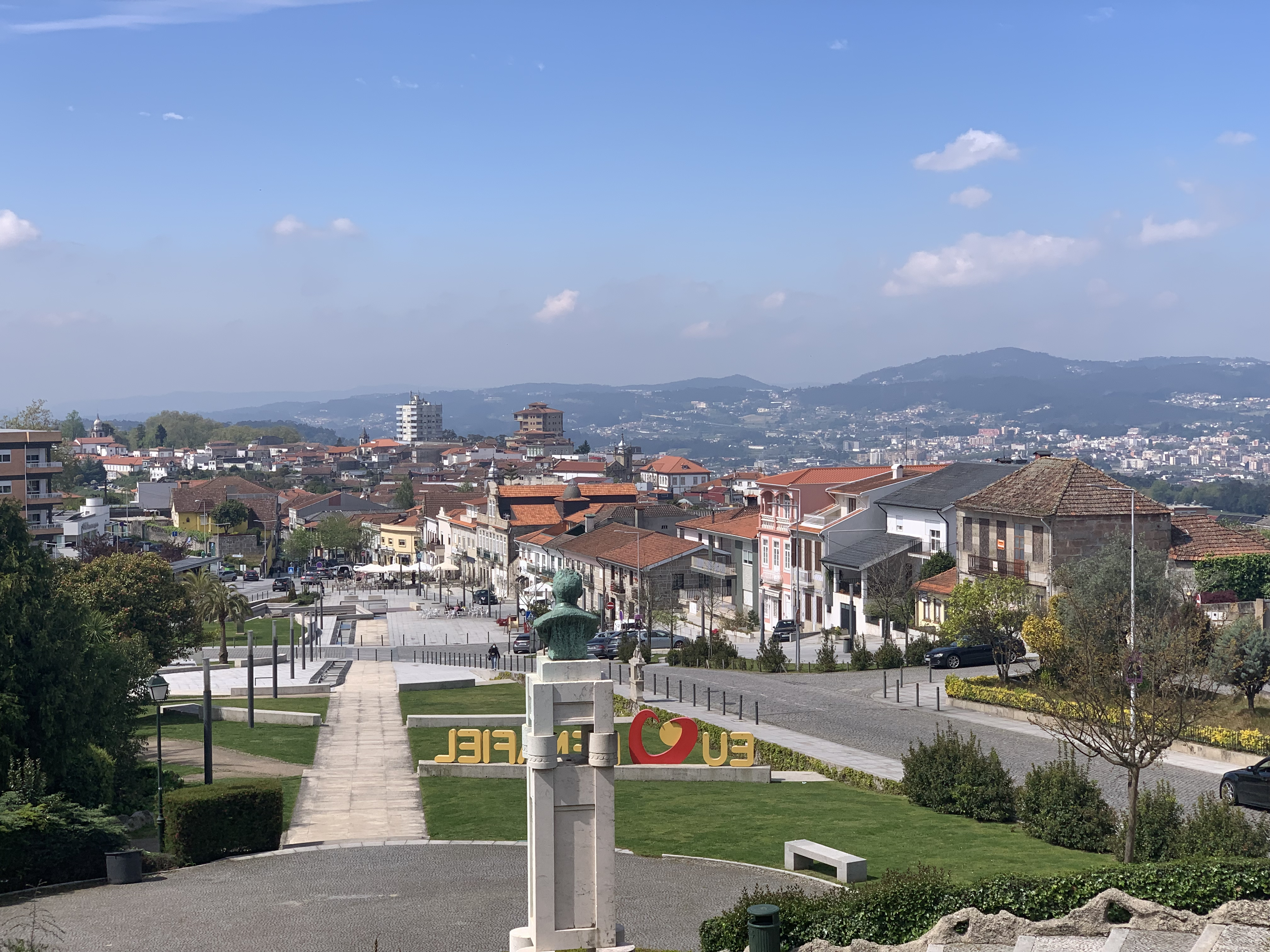
- Partial view of Penafiel

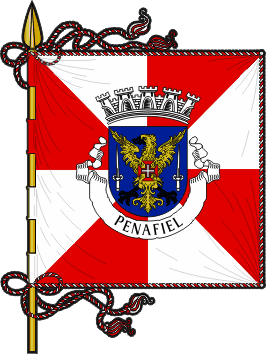
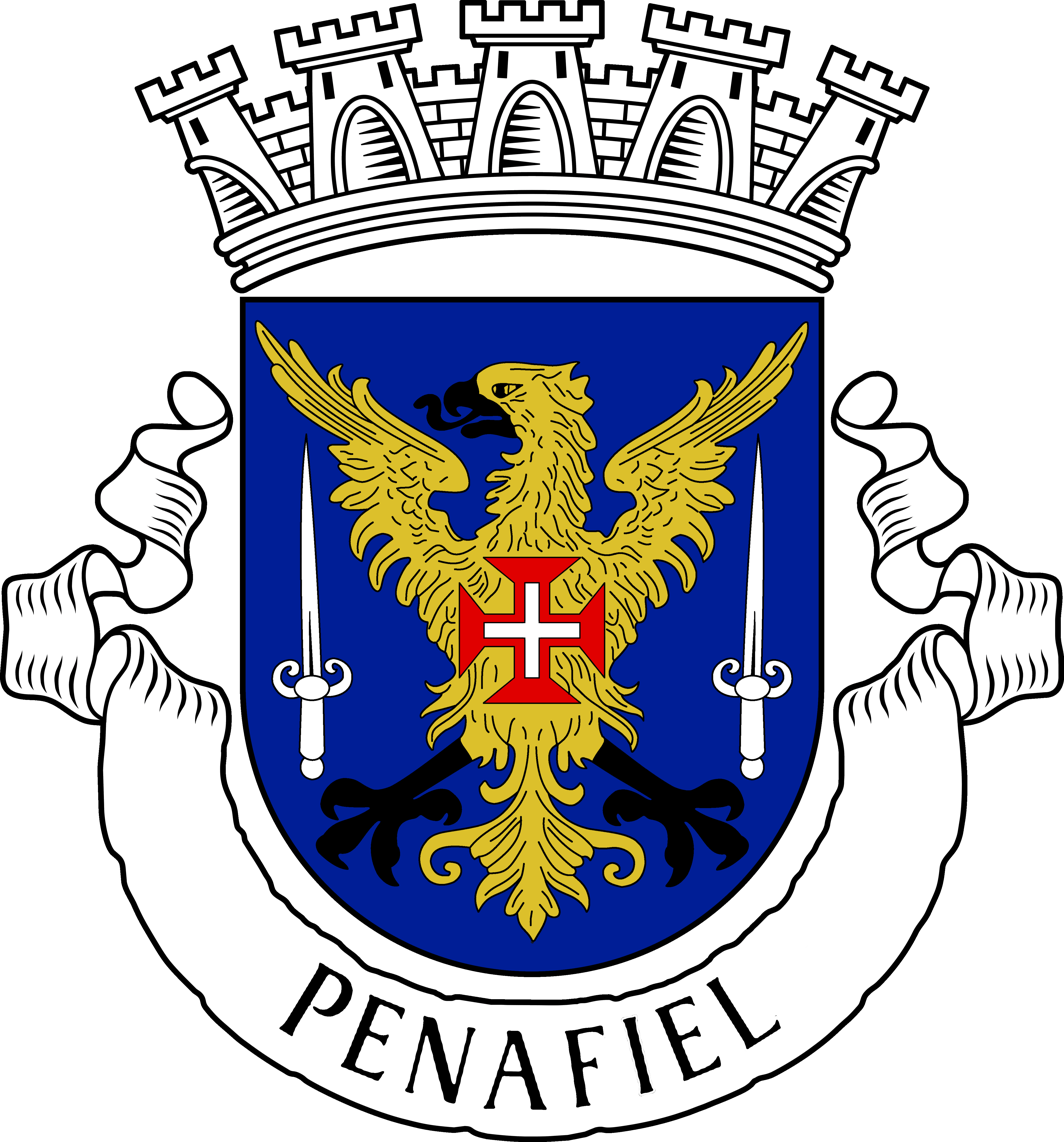
- Flag Coat of arms
- Interactive map of Penafiel
- Coordinates: 41°12′N 8°17′W
- Country: Portugal
- Region: Norte
- Intermunic. comm.: Tâmega e Sousa
- District: Porto
- Parishes: 28

Area
  - Total: 212.24 km^{2} (81.95 sq mi)

Population (2011)
  - Total: 72,265
  - Density: 340.49/km^{2} (881.86/sq mi)
- Time zone: UTC+00:00 (WET)
  - Summer (DST): UTC+01:00 (WEST)
- Website: http://www.cm-penafiel.pt/

Penafiel (Portuguese pronunciation: [pɨnɐfiˈɛl] or Portuguese pronunciation: [ˌpenɐfiˈɛl]) is a municipality and former bishopric (now a Latin Catholic titular see) in the northern Portuguese district of Porto. Capital of the Tâmega Subregion, the population was 72,265 in 2011, in an area of 212.24 square kilometres (81.95 mi^{2}).

== History ==
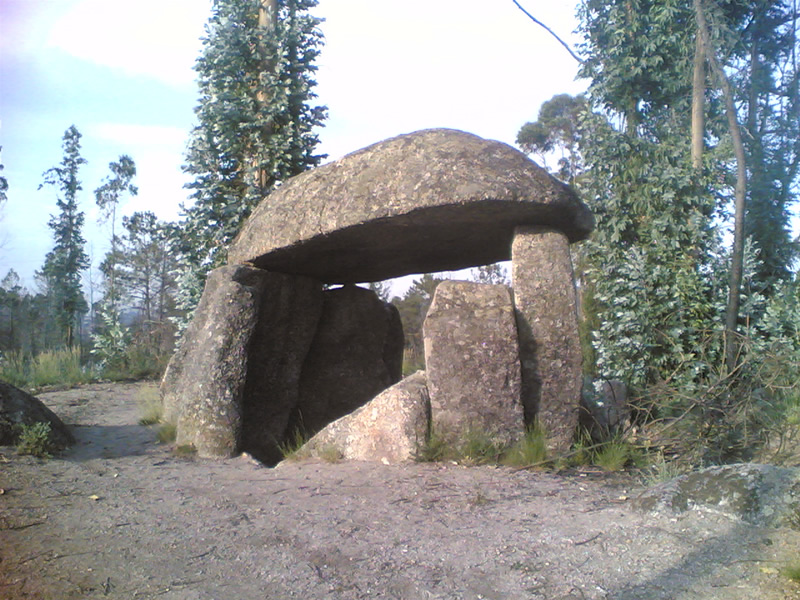
The Dolmen of Santa Marta, one of the pre-historic tombs that dot the landscape

The region was occupied since pre-history, as evidenced by the proliferation of megalithic monuments, stone settlements and castros. This includes the Menhir of Luzim, a 2.5 metres (8.2 ft) tall stone dating to an occupation of 3–4000 years B.C. Similarly, in the civil parish of Luzim, are the rock engravings that have existed for 3000 years. In addition, there are various rock forts (castros), subject of archaeological studies, such as the archaeological "city of the dead" in Citânia de Monte Mozinho. One of the largest in the Iberian Peninsula, it was the precursor to the Galician organized community of Cividade Gallaeci; the hill fort is dotted with traces of various cultures: Galician-Lusitanian, Roman, Visigoth and Moorish. There different legends that indicate the origins of the name Penafiel, although the common thread associates it with the many forts situated in the locality.

With the consolidation and incorporation into the Roman world, these hill forts were reorganized and moved down from the hilltops, dispersing into concentrated settlements in open areas and encircled by cultivated parcels, such as in Bouça do Ouro (Boelhe). The Roman spa town of São Vicente do Pinheiro was an example of these centres, developing around the natural resources in the region. In addition, vains of gold interspersed in the Schist and Quartzite quarries attracted Roman settlers from the empire, resulting in an intense artisanal economy, supported by the circulation of a single currency, culture and language.

In the 9th century, activity became concentrated in the Civitas Anegia on the headwaters of the Tâmega and Douro, that dominated the lands along margins of those rivers. This civitas was the precursor of Penafiel de Canas, an area that assumed an import role, but occupied a smaller area and embryonic place that concentrated on agriculture and fishing. The lands were seats of the Romanesque ecclesiastical seigneurs of the Benedictine monasteries of Paço de Sousa and Bustelo. Supporting a rich cultural influence, Paço de Sousa boasted a magnificent Romanesque architecture and gave shelter to the historian Egas Moniz Ribadouro, schoolmaster of Afonso Henriques. Other noble houses of medieval period include Barbosa de Honor (Rans), with its tower overlooking agricultural lands, or the transformed tower of Coreixas (Irivo). Romanesque religious architecture proliferated during the post-Roman period; the Romanesque temple of Boelhe or Church of São Salvador da Gândara (venerating a deceased saint's skull) attracted pilgrims to the region, as did the Church of Abragão, the late-Gothic Church of São Miguel da Eja and the funerary memorial of Ermida (Irivo).

During this time emerged a new reality: a fortified settlement that developed in the parish of Moazares, home of the Romanesque church of Santa Luzia (circled by sculpted tombs) was along the banks of the river, along the roadway from Porto and crossing the Sousa at the medieval bridge of Cepeda was an ideal local to build an urban community to specialize in services, artesnal commerce and sale of manufactured goods, supported by a medieval fair. The area was known as Arrifana de Sousa. Legend suggests that name came from the name Ariana (the daughter of Hermenegildo González and D. Mumadona Dias) who, following her father's death, inherited the land in the 10th century.

At its founding, it was dominated by two castles: one along the northern bank of the Sousa river, called the Castle of Aguiar de Sousa and the second along the southern margin, called Pena. The town was attacked several times by Moors, but, owing to its resistance was referred to in Latin as Pennafidelis, shortened to the Castle of Penafiel.

By the 13th century, many of the plots of land were owned by Castile's ex-Queen Mafalda of Portugal.

The civil parish of Arrifana de Sousa was established in the sixteenth century. In the same century, in 1519, King Manuel I of Portugal granted the region a foral (charter) that raised the settlement to the status of village. Yet, its change would only occur in the reign of King D. John V (by decree on 7 October 1741).

The site was crossed by various roads, where João Correia, a rich Portoense merchant with contracts in Flanders established his home; he was a new Christian, who raised a Manueline chapel to the Holy Spirit (and who erected his bronze funerary tomb).

As it grew, Arrifana assumed as patron saint São Martinho (Marin), and in the middle of the 16th century, a new Mannerist temple was constructed over the old chapel of João Correia.

The lands continued as an administrative dependency of Porto, until King D. John I conceded it a privilege for supporting his cause.

Arrifana de Sousa continued to grow as a centre of services and industry, supported by an annual fair on the feast day of São Martinho, resulting in the expansion of the urban environment to the upper elevations and the construction of the Church of the Misericórdia. Meanwhile, the nobles established their homes outside the town centre, preferring to live in their ancestral estates, established from the land rents and businesses and overseas commerce.

By law, during the reign of King Joseph (dated 3 March 1770), the place name was officially changed to Penafiel and the status of city conferred.

== Ecclesiastical history ==
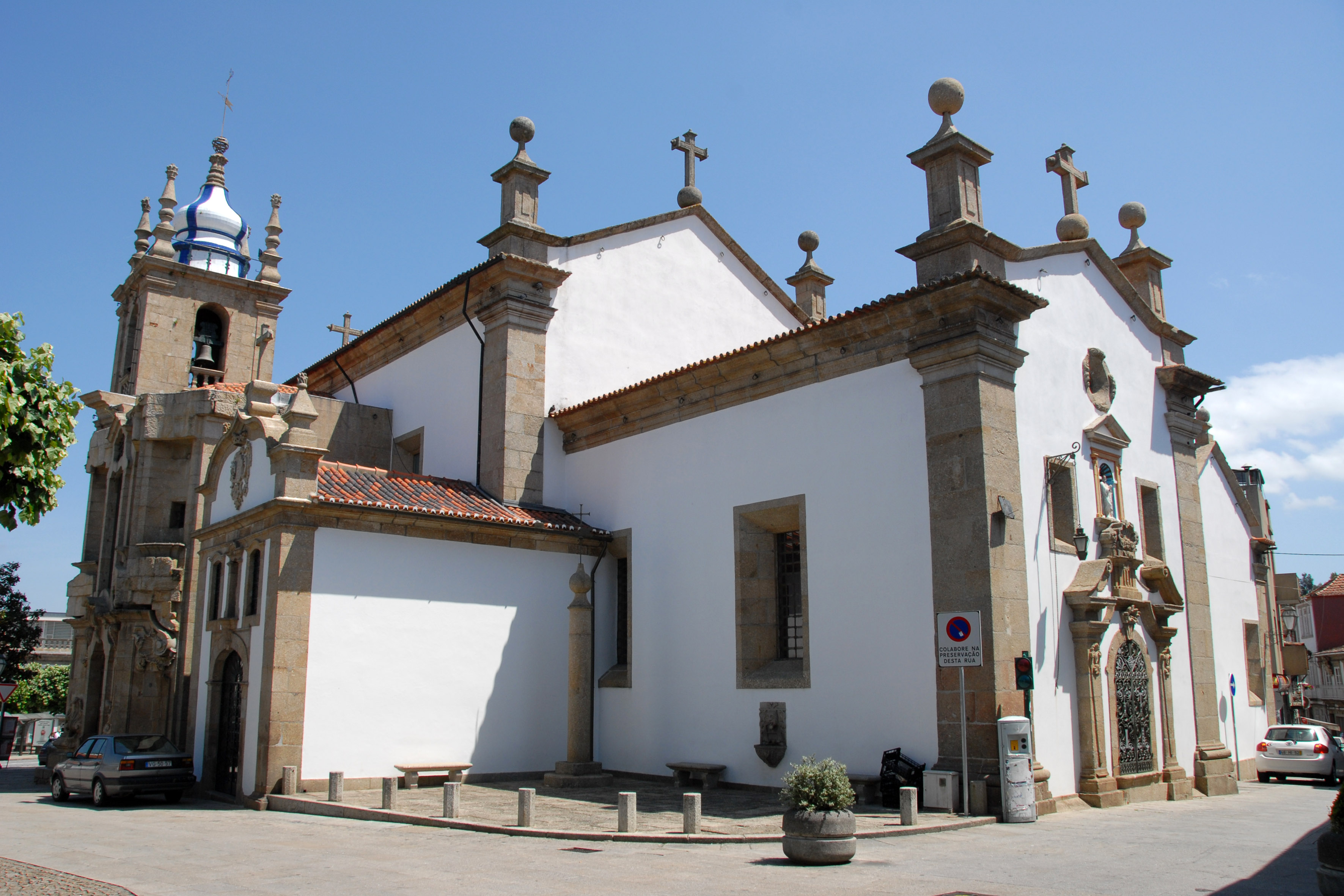
Former cathedral, now Igreja da Misericordia: Our Lady of Mercy

On 1 June 1770, by papal bull issued by Pope Clement XIV, the Diocese of Penafiel was established, separating it from the ecclesiastical Diocese of Porto, apparently as suffragan of the Metropolitan Archdiocese of Braga. Rather than for pastoral reasons, the creation of the See was inspired by the wish of king's de facto reigning Prime Minister, the Marquess of Pombal, to punish the Bishop of Porto by depriving him of most of his diocese – the whole comarca di Penafiel (administrative district), comprising 102 parishes, even some in ferguesias (suburbs) of the great Porto port city.

The Pope appointed the Carmelite Friar Inácio de São Caetano (born 1718.07.31), confessor of the future Queen Maria I of Portugal (then Princess of Brazil), as its first prelate. But he would never administer the Diocese (as he was in Brazil), and was eventually convinced by the Queen to give-up the bishopric, consoled with a nominal promotion as Titular Archbishop of Thessalonica (1778.12.14 – death 1788.11.29), while she successfully requested the Holy See to undo the See creation.

On 11 November 1778, Pope Pius VI decided by motu proprio to extinguish the diocese, incorporating its administration (once more) into the mother Diocese of Porto, which it remains part of.

The Church of Our Lady of Mercy, which had been bombarded its cathedral, lost that status without being made co-cathedral.

=== Titular see ===
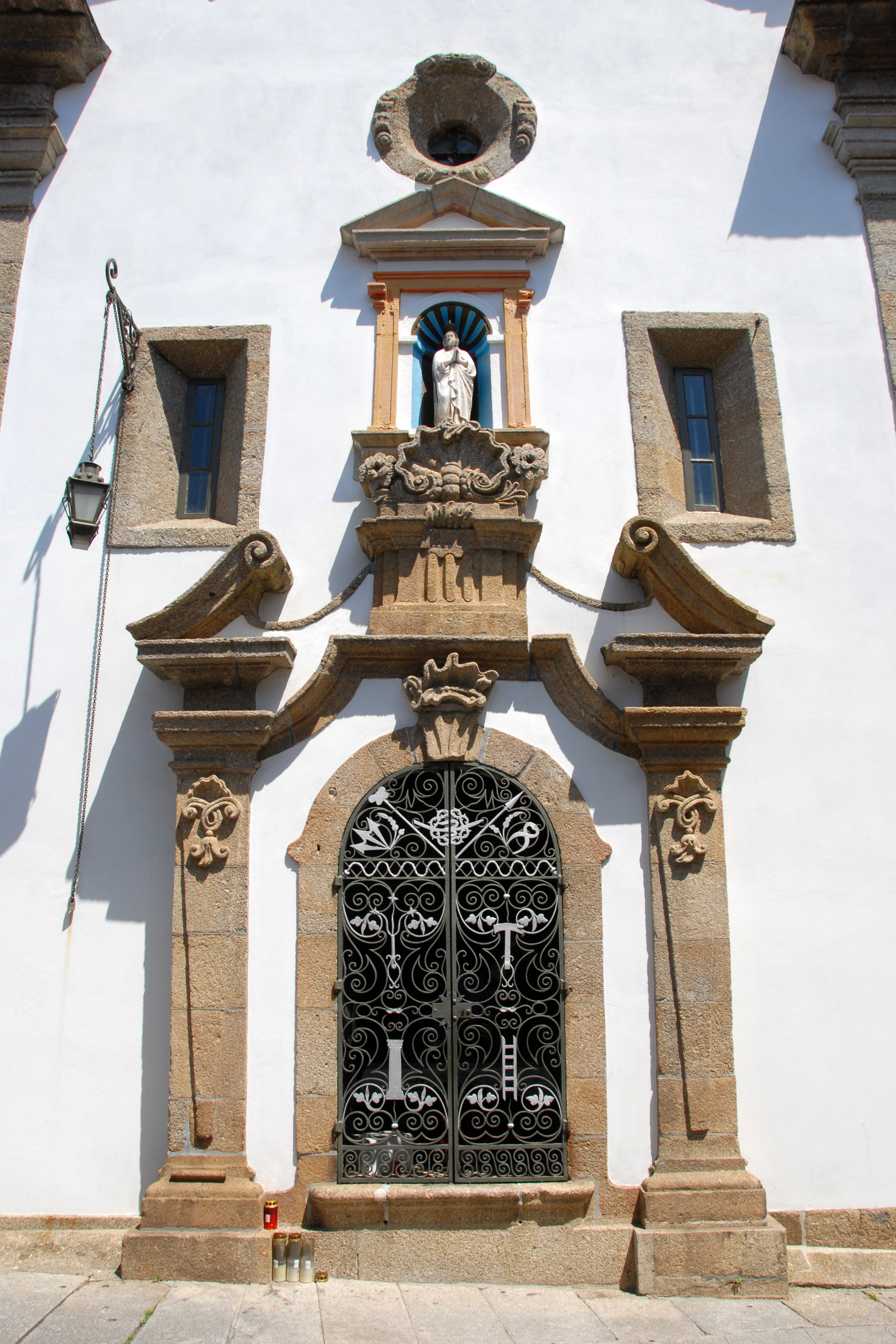
The front facade and portico of the Misericórdia

In 1969 the diocese was nominally restored as Latin Titular bishopric of Penafiel (Portuguese) / Pintien(sis) (Latin adjective).

It has had the following incumbents, mostly of the fitting Episcopal (lowest) rank, with an archiepiscopal exception:

- Bernard Theodore Espelage, Friars Minor (O.F.M.) (1969.08.25 – death 1971.02.19) as emeritate, former Bishop of Gallup (USA) (1940.07.20 – retired 1969.08.25)
- John Joseph Mulcahy (1974.12.28 – death 1994.04.26) as Auxiliary Bishop of Archdiocese of Boston (Massachusetts, USA) (1974.12.28 – retired 1992.07.21) and emeritate
- Francisco-Javier Lozano Sebastián (1994.07.09 – ...) as papal diplomat : Apostolic Nuncio (ambassador) to Tanzania (1994.07.09 – 1999.03.20), Apostolic Nuncio to Democratic Republic of Congo (1999.03.20 – 2001.12.15), Apostolic Nuncio to Croatia (2003.08.04 – 2007.12.10), Apostolic Nuncio to Moldova (2007.12.10 – 2015.12.05), Apostolic Nuncio to Romania (2007.12.10 – 2015.12.05).

== Geography ==
=== Physical geography ===
The municipality extends within an area of 212.2 square kilometres (81.9 mi^{2}), in a confluence of river valleys marked by the Douro, Tâmega and Sousa Rivers, connecting the littoral region and the Transmontana zone. It is a landscape of deep valleys, with intense irrigated zones and pasturelands, with fields encircled by forests of pine and eucalyptus. This inter-fluvial region have granite soils and is rich in water resources, permitting intensive agriculture and extraction industries. The southwest extension of the municipality include a complex of Schist and Greywacke geology, resulting in mountainous, uncultivated and largely forest lands.

An intermediary zone, dividing the littoral and mountainous regions, the region was an important transitory point, with lines of communication extending along inter-regional, land and fluvial networks. The first example was the "royal roadways" that date to the medieval period, that connect Porto and the Trás-os-Montes, that resulted the development of the urban centre, that was a fulcrum in supporting transiting peoples and goods. The Douro was an important link and penetrated the interior, while the flanks of the Alto Douro were used to produce vineyards. The "Entre-os-Rios" district was also an important part in supporting travel along the interior.

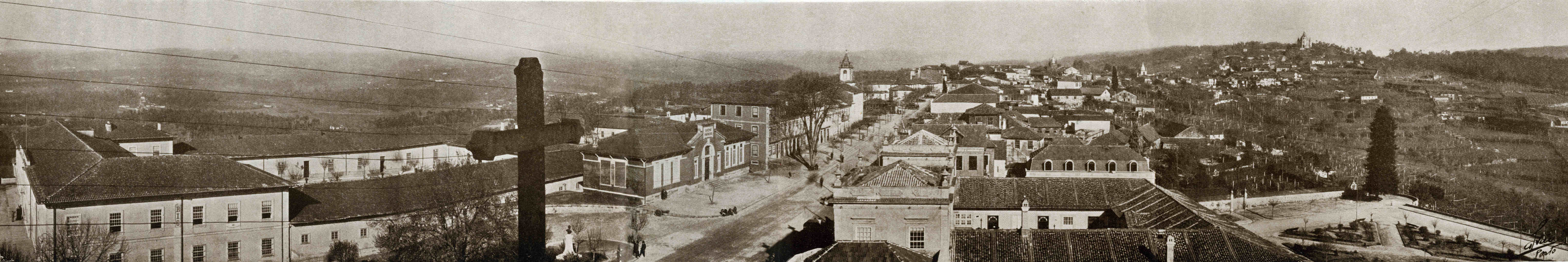
A panoramic view of Penafiel in 1930

=== Climate ===
Penafiel has a Mediterranean climate (Köppen: Csb) with cool to mild, rainy winters and warm to hot, dry summers

Climate data for Luzim, Penafiel, normals and extremes 1982-2000, altitude: 250 m (820 ft)
Month	Jan	Feb	Mar	Apr	May	Jun	Jul	Aug	Sep	Oct	Nov	Dec	Year
Record high °C (°F)	20.0 (68.0)	23.2 (73.8)	31.6 (88.9)	30.4 (86.7)	32.9 (91.2)	36.0 (96.8)	38.6 (101.5)	38.6 (101.5)	37.2 (99.0)	31.2 (88.2)	31.0 (87.8)	22.4 (72.3)	38.6 (101.5)
Mean daily maximum °C (°F)	12.2 (54.0)	14.4 (57.9)	17.2 (63.0)	17.5 (63.5)	20.7 (69.3)	25.1 (77.2)	27.9 (82.2)	27.8 (82.0)	25.4 (77.7)	20.7 (69.3)	16.1 (61.0)	13.2 (55.8)	19.8 (67.7)
Daily mean °C (°F)	8.0 (46.4)	9.8 (49.6)	11.8 (53.2)	12.4 (54.3)	15.4 (59.7)	19.0 (66.2)	21.3 (70.3)	21.1 (70.0)	19.3 (66.7)	15.5 (59.9)	11.7 (53.1)	9.5 (49.1)	14.6 (58.2)
Mean daily minimum °C (°F)	3.8 (38.8)	5.0 (41.0)	6.5 (43.7)	7.6 (45.7)	10.1 (50.2)	12.9 (55.2)	14.8 (58.6)	14.4 (57.9)	13.1 (55.6)	10.4 (50.7)	7.4 (45.3)	5.7 (42.3)	9.3 (48.7)
Record low °C (°F)	−4.6 (23.7)	−2.6 (27.3)	−3.2 (26.2)	−0.2 (31.6)	1.2 (34.2)	4.7 (40.5)	8.1 (46.6)	3.8 (38.8)	5.3 (41.5)	2.4 (36.3)	−3.2 (26.2)	−3.1 (26.4)	−4.6 (23.7)
Average rainfall mm (inches)	194.4 (7.65)	126.8 (4.99)	70.0 (2.76)	154.1 (6.07)	109.8 (4.32)	45.3 (1.78)	20.4 (0.80)	27.0 (1.06)	74.2 (2.92)	152.0 (5.98)	198.0 (7.80)	237.7 (9.36)	1,409.7 (55.49)
Average rainy days (≥ 0.1 mm)	12.8	9.5	7.5	11.6	9.4	5.2	2.5	2.6	6.5	11.2	13.8	14.0	106.6
Source: Instituto de Meteorologia

=== Human geography ===
Population of Penafiel (1801–2008)
Year	Pop.	±%
1801	18,576	—
1849	26,944	+45.0%
1900	31,799	+18.0%
1930	37,496	+17.9%
1960	49,924	+33.1%
1981	64,267	+28.7%
1991	68,444	+6.5%
2001	71,800	+4.9%
2011	72,265	+0.6%

With 28 civil parishes it includes a resident population of 72,000 inhabitants (approximately 338.4 people per kilometre square), integrated into the Associação de Municípios do Vale do Sousa (Vale de Sousa Municipal Association) and NUTSIII Tâmega Subregion. The region is settled, but in dispersed enclaves, supported by small industry and commerce, while newer residential homes juxtaposition older rural dwellings. These older homes are usually maintained by part-time farming families and seniors, perpetuated by intense migration and facilitated by their proximity to major roadways.

The municipality is administered by the following civil parishes (freguesias):

- Abragão
- Boelhe
- Bustelo
- Cabeça Santa
- Canelas
- Capela
- Castelões
- Croca
- Duas Igrejas
- Eja
- Fonte Arcada
- Galegos
- Guilhufe e Urrô
- Irivo
- Lagares e Figueira
- Luzim e Vila Cova
- Oldrões
- Paço de Sousa
- Penafiel
- Perozelo
- Rans
- Rio de Moinhos
- Rio Mau
- São Mamede de Recezinhos
- São Martinho de Recezinhos
- Sebolido
- Termas de São Vicente
- Valpedre

The parishes are, largely, semi-industrialized, with a mixture of modern homes and rural dwellings in nature. Villages have houses made with small stones and granite, both of which are common in locality of Penafiel.

== Economy ==
Extraction industries, civil construction firms and commerce employs a large number of workers, in addition to a strong concentration of service sector activities, confirmed by a Penafiel's central place in the regional economy.

Penafiel invested in new schools and renovating others during the 20th century, maintaining several kindergartens, primary and secondary schools.

The municipal council is responsible for maintaining several health centres, clinics and hospital, with Padre Américo Hospital situated in the parish of Guilhufe.

The council has some train stations in their territory of buses throughout the country and a vast road system.

=== Tourism ===
Penafiel is the centre for therapeutic treatments and spas, highlighted by the São Vicente Spa and the Inatel Entre-os Rios Spa. The São Vicente is known for the characteristic quality of its waters: the spa is known for the hyper-mineralized waters, that include concentrated sulphurous and carbonaceous akline silicates and fluoridated water. It is considered the most alkaline among the sulphurous waters of Portugal and Europe, with temperatures of about 18.5 °C (65.3 °F), advocated for the treatment of respiratory diseases and musculo-skeletal system ailments.

Magikland (formerly Bracalândia), one of the largest Portuguese theme parks, is located in Penafiel.

Tourism is cyclical in the region, influence by the staggering of religious and secular activities, but marked by special events throughout the year, particularly around the religious feast of São Martinho. This includes the literary festival Escritaria and the agricultural fair Agrival, which had its basis in the traditional medieval fairs.

== Historical heritage ==
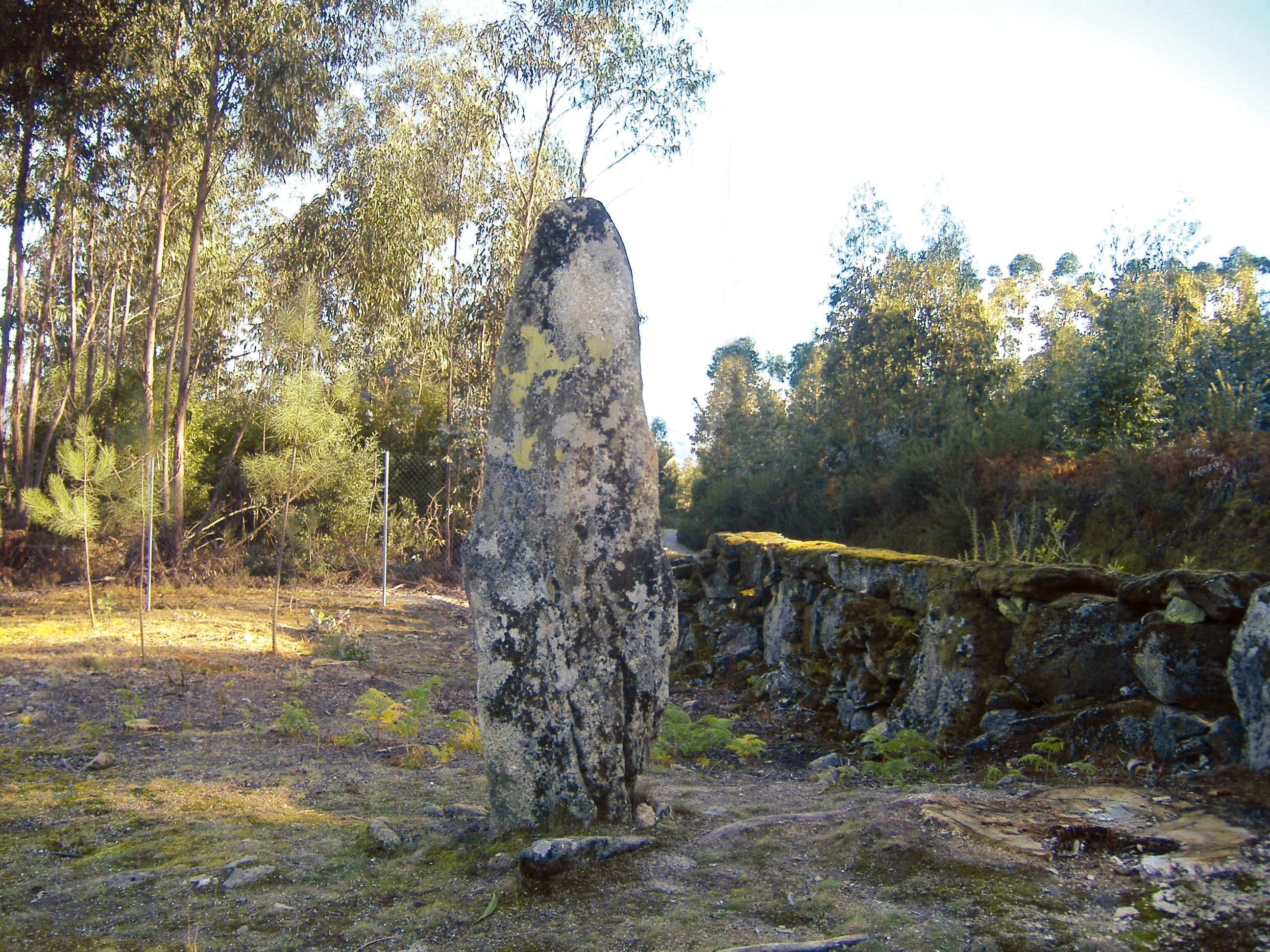
A view of the ancient Menhir of Luzim on the archaeological site

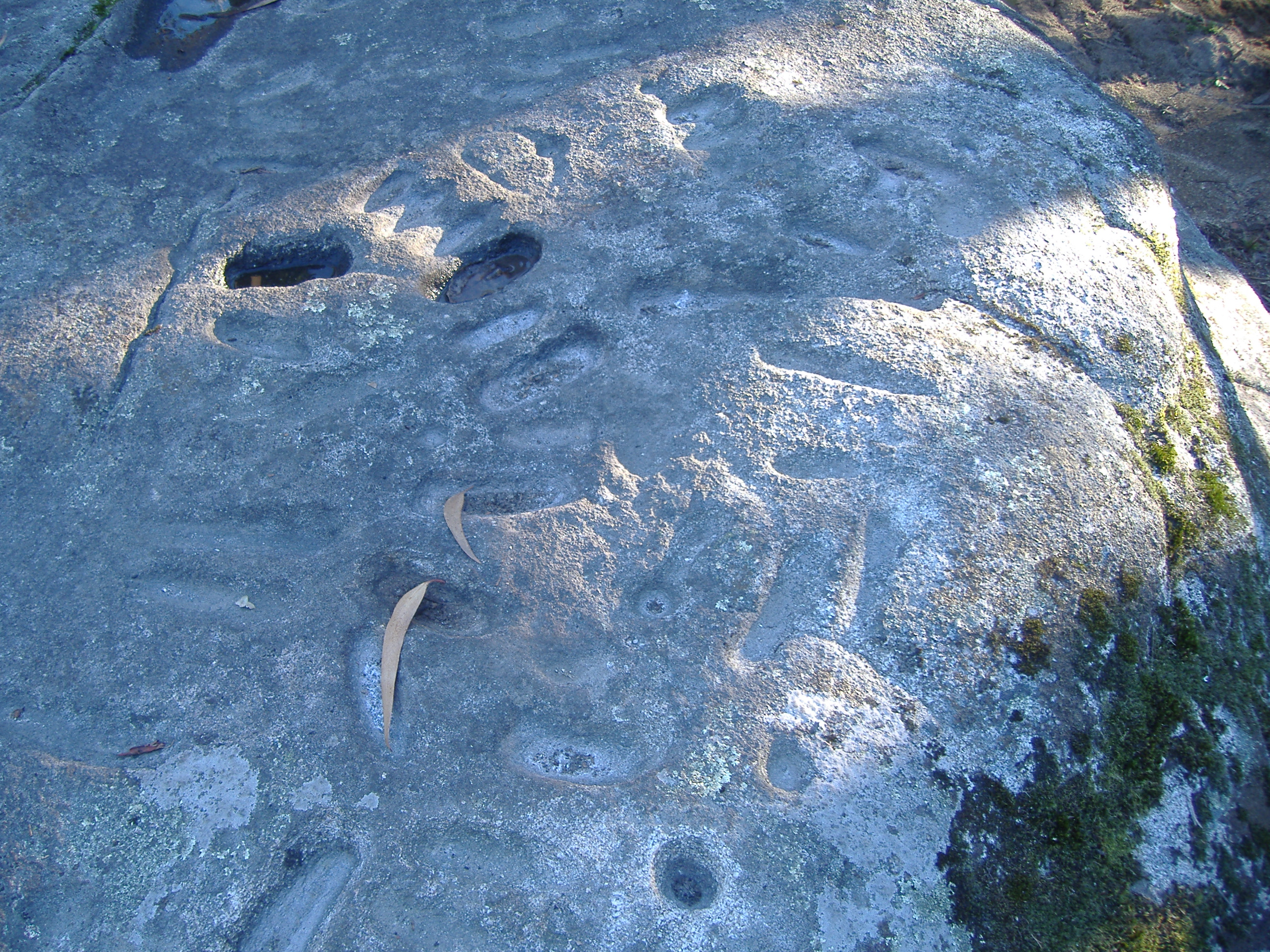
The rock carvings associated with pre-historic settlements in the 3-4000 B.C.

The region of Penafiel is known for a history dating to the pre-historic period, marked by dolmens, petroglyphs, necropoli and fortified settlements constructed of stone. But, over time and through the influence of various cultural groups (Romans, Visigoths, Moors) the area began to evolve into a modern centre, marked by the evolution in its architecture from rudimentary stone dolmens to signeurial manorhouses and monumental estates.

=== Archaeological ===
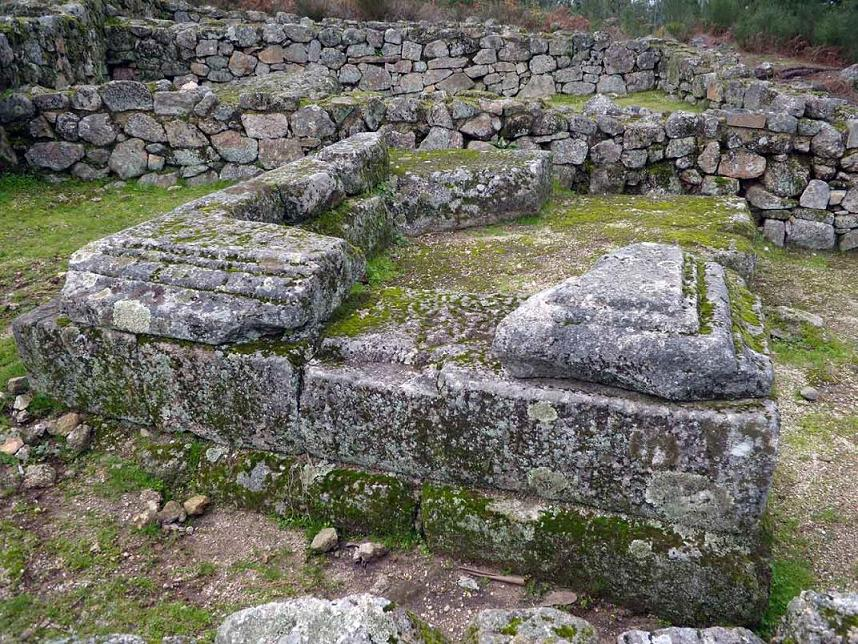
The ruins of the former-fortified settlement of Castro of Monte Mozinho

- Castro of Monte Mozinho (Portuguese: Povoado fortificado de Monte Mozinho/Cidade Morta de Penafiel)
- Dolmen of Santa Marta (Portuguese: Anta de Santa Marta/Dólmen da Portela/Forno dos Mouros
- Menhir of Luzim (Portuguese: Menir de Luzim/Marco de Luzim)
- Prehistoric Rock-Art Site of Lomar (Portuguese: Gravuras rupestres de Lomar)
- Prehistoric Rock-Art Site of Pegadinhas de São Gonçalo (Portuguese: Mamoa e gravuras rupestres/Pegadinhas de São Gonçalo/Mamoa da Tapada de Sequeiros)
- Prehistoric Rock-Art Site of Tapada das Eiras (Portuguese: Penedo com gravuras rupestres na Tapada das Eiras/Mata da Casa das Eiras)
- Tomb of Monte de São Roque (Portuguese: Túmulo do Monte de São Roque)

=== Civic architecture ===
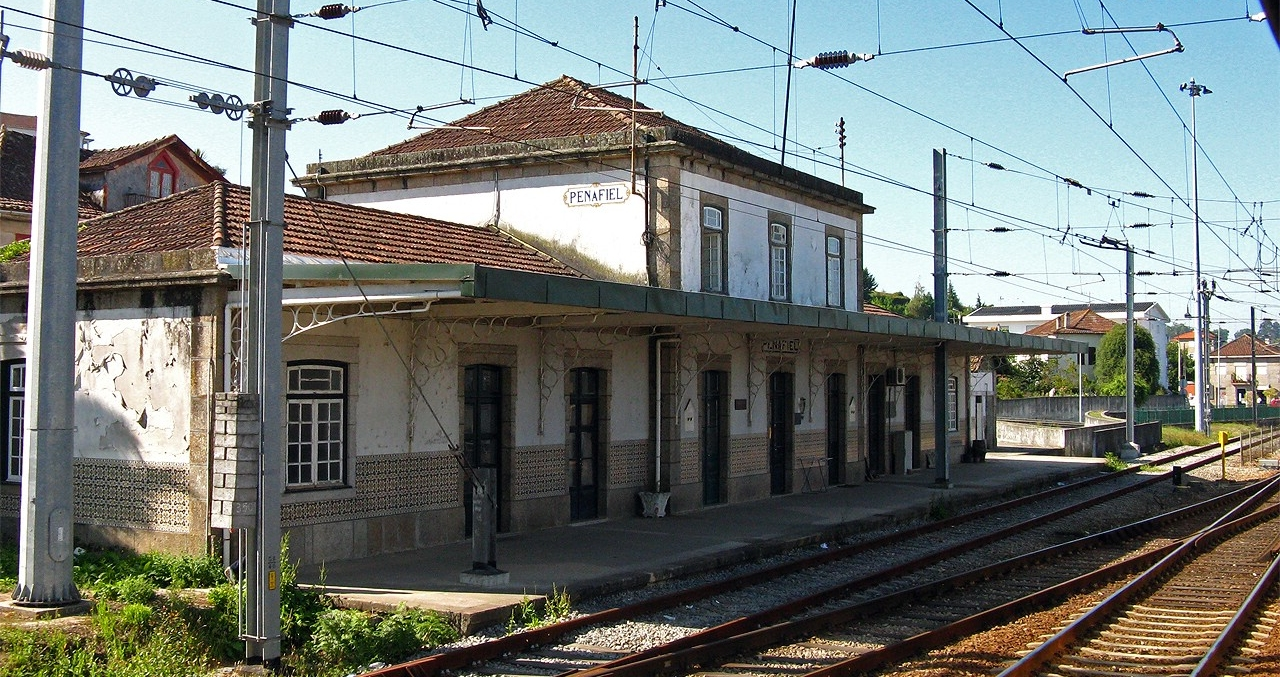
The turn of the century railway station at Penafiel

- Aqueduct of the Monastery of Bustelo (Portuguese: Aqueduto do Mosteiro de Bustelo)
- Asylum of Santo António dos Capuchos (Portuguese: Asilo de Meninas Pobres/Lar de Santo António dos Capuchos)
- Bridge Duarte Pacheco (Portuguese: Ponte Duarte Pacheco)
- Bridge of Espindo (Portuguese: Ponte de Espindo)
- Bridge of Lardosa (Portuguese: Ponte de Lardosa/Pontão de Barbosa)
- Bridge of Rans (Portuguese: Ponte Velha de Rans
- Bridge of Santa Marta (Portuguese: Ponte de Santa Marta)
- Bridge of Vau (Portuguese: Ponte do Vau)
- Estate of Cimo de Vila (Portuguese: Casa e Quinta do Cimo de Vila)
- Estate of Abol (Portuguese: Quinta de Abol)
- Estate of Aveleda (Portuguese: Quinta da Aveleda)
- Estate of Boveira (Portuguese: Quinta do Boveira)
- Estate of Casa Nova (Portuguese: Quinta de Casa Nova)
- Estate of Companhia (Portuguese: Casa e Quinta da Companhia)
- Estate of Curveira (Portuguese: Quinta da Curveira)
- Estate of Fentão de Baixo (Portuguese: Quinta Fentão de Baixo)
- Estate of Maragossa (Portuguese: Casa e Quinta da Maragossa)
- Estate of Mesão Fria (Portuguese: Quinta de Mesão Frio)
- Estate of Mogol (Portuguese: Quinta do Mogal)
- Estate of Pena (Portuguese: Quinta da Pena)
- Estate of Perosinho (Portuguese: Quinta do Perosinho)
- Estate of Souto (Portuguese: Quinta do Souto)
- Estate of Ventuzela (Portuguese: Quinta da Ventuzela)
- Fountain Armoriada (Portuguese: Fonte Armoriada nos Jardins da Casa de Cabanelas)
- Hospital Padre Américo Vale do Sousa (Portuguese: Hospital da Santa Casa da Misericórdia de Penafiel/Hospital Padre Américo Vale do Sousa)
- Jailhouse of Penafiel (Portuguese: Cadeia Comarcã de Penafiel/Câmara Municipal de Penafiel)
- Judicial Courts of Penafiel (Portuguese: Tribunal Judicial de Penafiel)
- Manorhouse and Tower of Honra de Barbosa (Portuguese: Solar e Torre da Honra de Barbosa/Honra de Barbosa)
- Municipal Palace/Hall of Penafiel (Portuguese: Câmara Municipal de Penafiel/Edifício dos Paços do Concelho de Penafiel)
- Palace Hotel of Termas de São Vicente (Portuguese: Palace Hotel e SPA Termal das Termas de São Vicente)
- Penafiel Railway Station (Portuguese: Estação Ferroviária de Penafiel)
- Pillory of Honra de Barbosa (Portuguese: Pelourinho da Honra de Barbosa/Pelourinho de Rans)
- Pillory of Penafiel (Portuguese: Pelourinho de Penafiel)
- Residence of Cantoneiros (Portuguese: Casa de Cantoneiros em Entre-os-Rios)
- Residence of Reboleira (Portuguese: Casa da Reboleira)
- School of Novelas (Portuguese: Escola Cantina de Novelas/Escola Básica de Novelas)
- Thermal Spa of Quinta da Torre (Portuguese: Edifício das Termas da Quinta da Torre)
- Thermal Spa of São Vicente (Portuguese: Termas de São Vicente/Balneário Romano de São Vicente)
- Tower of Coreixas (Portuguese: Torre de Coreixas/Torre de Durigo)

=== Religious architecture ===
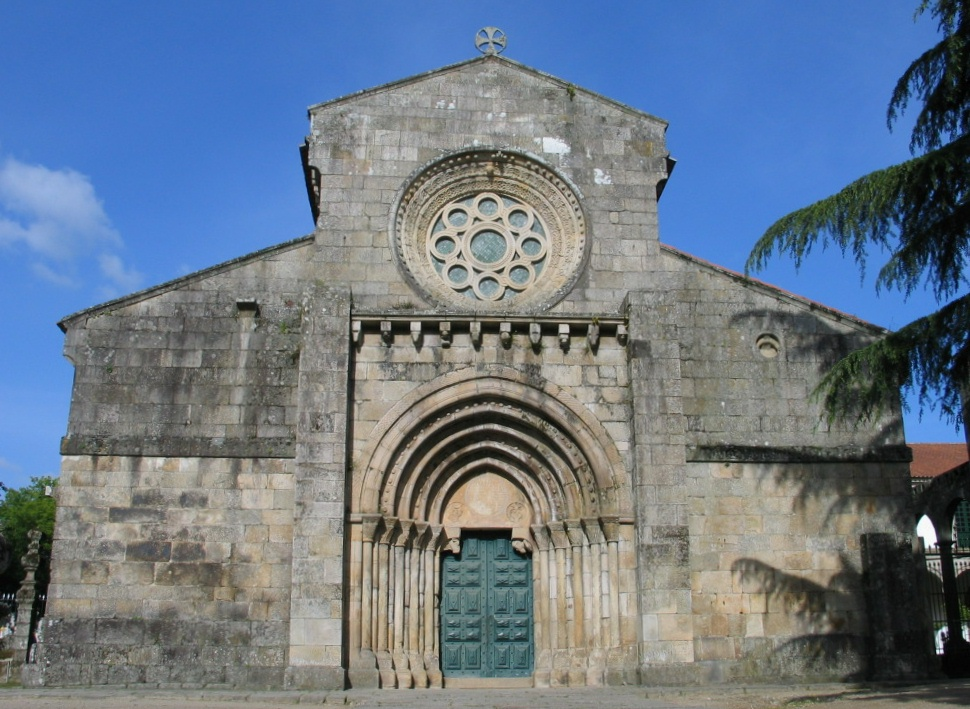
The imposing Romanesque facade of the Monastery/Church of Paço de Sousa

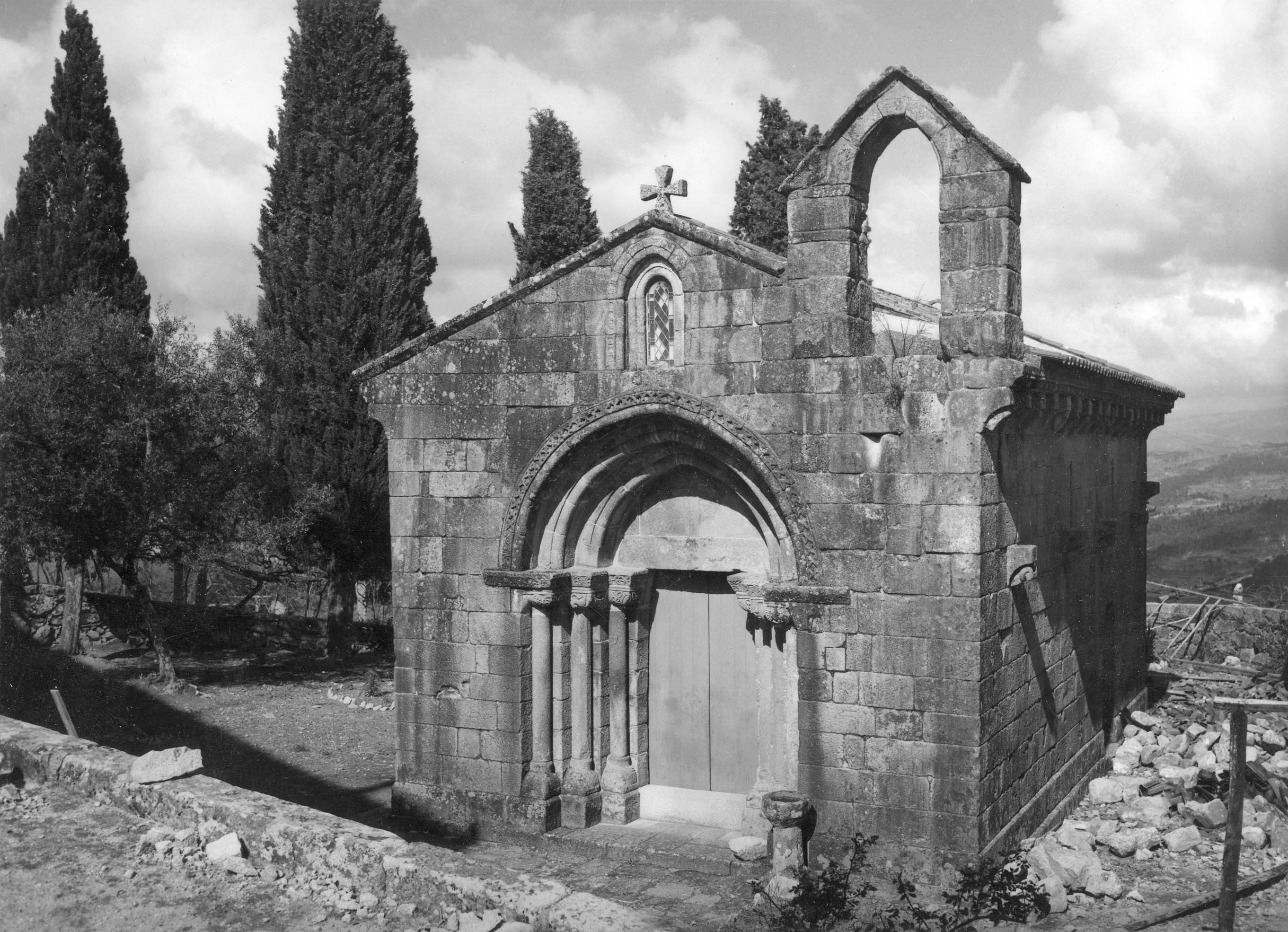
The facade of the Church of São Gens

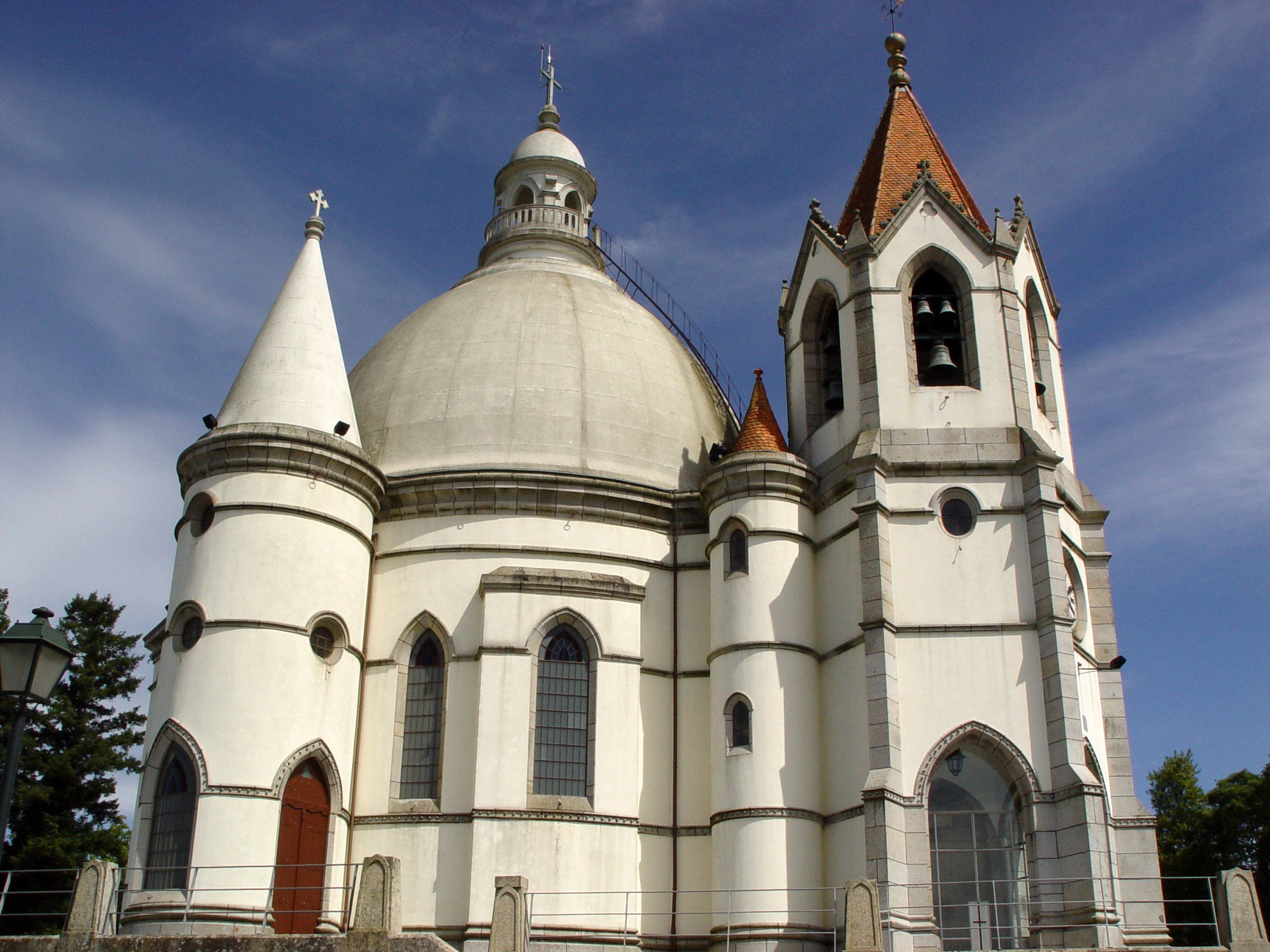
The Sanctuary of Senhora da Piedade e Santos Passos

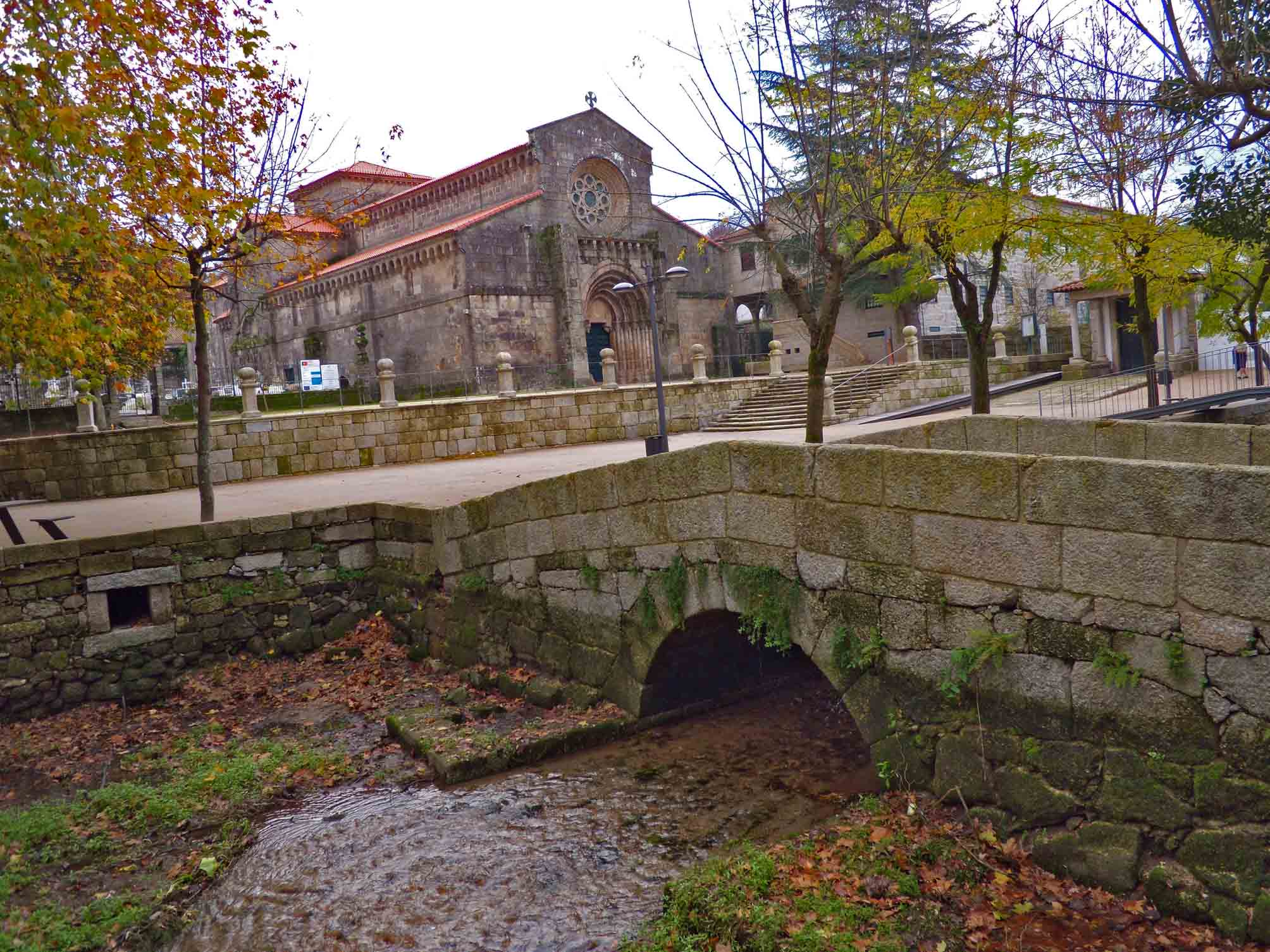
Monastery of Paços de Sousa

- Chapel of the Divino Salvador (Portuguese: Capela do Divino Salvador)
- Chapel of Lagares (Portuguese: Capela em Lagares)
- Chapel of Menino Jesus (Portuguese: Capela do Menino Jesus/Capela da Honra de Barbosa)
- Chapel of Nossa Senhora da Ajuda (Portuguese: Capela de Nossa Senhora da Ajuda)
- Chapel of Nossa Senhora da Cividade (Portuguese: Capela de Nossa Senhora da Cividade)
- Chapel of Nossa Senhora do Desterro (Portuguese: Capela de Nossa Senhora do Desterro)
- Chapel of Nossa Senhora da Lurdes (Portuguese: Capela de Nossa Senhora de Lourdes)
- Chapel of Nossa Senhora do Monte e São Brás (Portuguese: Capela de Nossa Senhora do Monte e São Brás)
- Chapel of Nossa Senhora de Paz (Portuguese: Capela de Nossa Senhora da Paz)
- Chapel of Nossa Senhora do Rosário (Portuguese: Capela de Nossa Senhora do Rosário)
- Chapel of Nossa Senhora da Saude (Portuguese: Capela de Nossa Senhora da Saúde)
- Chapel of the Sagrada Familia (Portuguese: Capela da Sagrada Família)
- Chapel of the Santa Casa da Misericórdia (Portuguese: Capela da Santa Casa da Misericórdia de Penafiel/Teatro Penafidelense)
- Chapel of Santa Luzia (Portuguese: Capela de Santa Luzia)
- Chapel of Santo António (Portuguese: Capela de Santo António)
- Chapel of São Bartolomeu (Portuguese: Capela de São Bartolomeu)
- Chapel of São Bartolomeu de Louredo (Portuguese: Capela de São Bartolomeu de Louredo)
- Chapel of São Domingos (Portuguese: Capela de São Domingos)
- Chapel of São João Baptista (Portuguese: Capela de São João Baptista)
- Chapel of São Julião (Portuguese: Capela de São Julião)
- Chapel of São Lourenço (Portuguese: Capela de São Lourenço)
- Chapel of São Mateus (Portuguese: Capela de São Mateus)
- Chapel of São Pedro (Portuguese: Capela de São Pedro)
- Chapel of São Roque (Portuguese: Capela de São Roque)
- Chapel of São Sebastião (Portuguese: Capela de São Sebastião)
- Chapel of São Simão (Portuguese: Capela de São Simão)
- Chapel of Senhor dos Aflitos (Portuguese: Capela do Senhor dos Aflitos)
- Chapel of Senhor do Calvário (Portuguese: Capela do Senhor do Calvário)
- Chapel of Senhor do Monte (Portuguese: Capela do Senhor do Monte)
- Chapel of the Thermals of Quinta da Torre (Portuguese: Capela das Termas da Quinta da Torre)
- Chapel of the Thermals of São Vicente (Portuguese: Capela das Termas de São Vicente)
- Convent of Santo António dos Capuchos (Portuguese: Convento de Santo António dos Capuchos/Igreja dos Capuchos)
- Chris the King of São Mamede de Recezinhos (Portuguese: Cristo Rei de São Mamede de Recezinhos
- Church of the Divino Salvador (Portuguese: Igreja Paroquial de Cabeça Santa/Igreja do Divino Salvador)
- Church of Nossa Senhora de Fátima (Portuguese: Igreja Paroquial de Oldrões/Igreja de Nossa Senhora de Fátima/Igreja Nova)
- Church of Nossa Senhora da Saúde (Portuguese: Igreja de Nossa Senhora da Saúde)
- Church of Nossa Senhora da Visitação (Portuguese: Igreja Paroquial de Perozelo/Igreja de Nossa Senhora da Visitação)
- Church of Santo Adrião (Portuguese: Igreja Paroquial de Duas Igrejas/Igreja de Santo Adrião)
- Church of Santo André (Portuguese: Igreja Paroquial de Marecos/Igreja de Santo André)
- Church of Santo Estêvão (Portuguese: Igreja Paroquial de Oldrões/Igreja de Santo Estêvão/Igreja Velha)
- Church of Santa Maria (Portuguese: Igreja Paroquial de Coreixas/Igreja de Santa Maria/Capela de Nossa Senhora da Conceição)
- Church of Santa Marinha (Portuguese: Igreja Paroquial de Figueira/Igreja de Santa Marinha)
- Church of Santa Marta (Portuguese: Igreja Paroquial de Santa Marta/Igreja de Santa Marta)
- Church of Santiago (Portuguese: Igreja Paroquial de Santiago de Subarrifana/Igreja de Santiago)
- Church of São João Baptista (Portuguese: Igreja de Rio Mau/Igreja de São João Baptista)
- Church of São João Evangelista (Portuguese: Igreja Paroquial de Guilhufe/Igreja de São João Evangelista)
- Church of São Mamede (Portuguese: Igreja Paroquial de Canelas/Igreja de São Mamede)
- Church of São Mamede de Recezinhos (Portuguese: Igreja Paroquial de São Mamede de Recezinhos/Igreja de São Mamede)
- Church of São Martinho (Portuguese: Igreja Paroquial de Milhundos/Igreja de São Martinho)
- Church of São Martinho de Recezinhos (Portuguese: Igreja Paroquial de São Martinho de Recezinhos/Igreja de São Martinho)
- Church of São Martinho de Tours (Portuguese: Igreja Paroquial de Lagares/Igreja de São Martinho de Tours/Igreja Nova)
- Church of São Miguel (Portuguese: Igreja Paroquial de Entre-os-Rios/Igreja de São Miguel)
- Church of São Paio (Portuguese: Igreja Paroquial de Portela/Igreja de São Paio)
- Church of São Paulo (Portuguese: Igreja Paroquial de Sebolido/Igreja de São Paulo)
- Church of São Pedro (Portuguese: Igreja Paroquial de Abragão/Igreja de São Pedro)
- Church of São Gens (Portuguese: Igreja Paroquial de Boelhe/Igreja de São Gens/Igreja Nova)
- Church of São Salvador (Portuguese: Igreja Paroquial de Galegos/Igreja de São Salvador)
- Church of São Tiago (Portuguese: Igreja Paroquial de Capela/Igreja de São Tiago)
- Church of São Tomé (Portuguese: Igreja Paroquial de Canas/Igreja de São Tomé/Capela de São Tomé)
- Church of São Vicente (Portuguese: Igreja Paroquial de Irivo/Igreja de São Vicente)
- Church of Santa Casa da Misericórdia (Portuguese: Edifício e Igreja da Santa Casa da Misericórdia de Penafiel/Museu de Arte Sacra da Misericórdia de Penafiel)
- Hermitage Memorial (Portuguese: Memorial da Ermida)
- Monastery of Bustelo (Portuguese: Mosteiro de Bustelo/Igreja Paroquial de Bustelo/Igreja de São Miguel)
- Monastery of Paço de Sousa (Portuguese: Mosteiro de Paço de Sousa/Igreja Paroquial de Paço de Sousa/Igreja do Salvador)
- Niche of Nossa Senhora de Fátima da Igreja (Portuguese: Nicho de Nossa Senhora de Fátima junto à Igreja)
- Niche of Nossa Senhora de Fátima de São Mamede (Portuguese: Nicho de Nossa Senhora de Fátima em São Mamede de Recezinhos)
- Niche of Nossa Senhora de Fátima de Uchada (Portuguese: Nicho de Nossa Senhora de Fátima na Rua da Uchada)
- Niche of São José (Portuguese: Nicho de São José)
- Paroquial Residence of Abragão (Portuguese: Residência Paroquial de Abragão)
- Paroquial Residence of São Martinho de Recezinhos (Portuguese: Salão Paroquial de São Martinho de Recezinhos)
- Sanctuary of Senhor dos Remédios (Portuguese: Santuário do Senhor dos Remédios)
- Sanctuary of Senhora da Piedade e Santos Passos (Portuguese: Santuário da Senhora da Piedade e Santos Passos)
- Way of the Cross of Penafiel (Portuguese: Passos da Via Sacra de Penafiel)
- Way of the Cross of Senhor dos Passos (Portuguese: Passos da Via Sacra e Capela do Senhor dos Passos)

Penafiel began building its library in 1863. On 6 June 1917, a new Municipal Library of Penafiel was inaugurated, located on Avenue Araújo e Silva, which closed in October 1919, reopened to the public on 6 June 1927 and was transferred to a small lounge on Avenida Sacadura Cabral.

== Sports ==
The most popular/practised sport within the municipality is football (soccer), leading hundreds of young people to the existing clubs. The largest club, F.C. Penafiel, was founded in 1951 and has regular presence on many levels of professional Portuguese seasons. During the 2014–2015 season, the club played in the Premier League after obtaining a rise from the previous season, finishing in 3rd place behind Moreirense (Champion) and FC Porto B. The club is also involved in other athletics activities winning several national and international competitions.

== Notable people ==
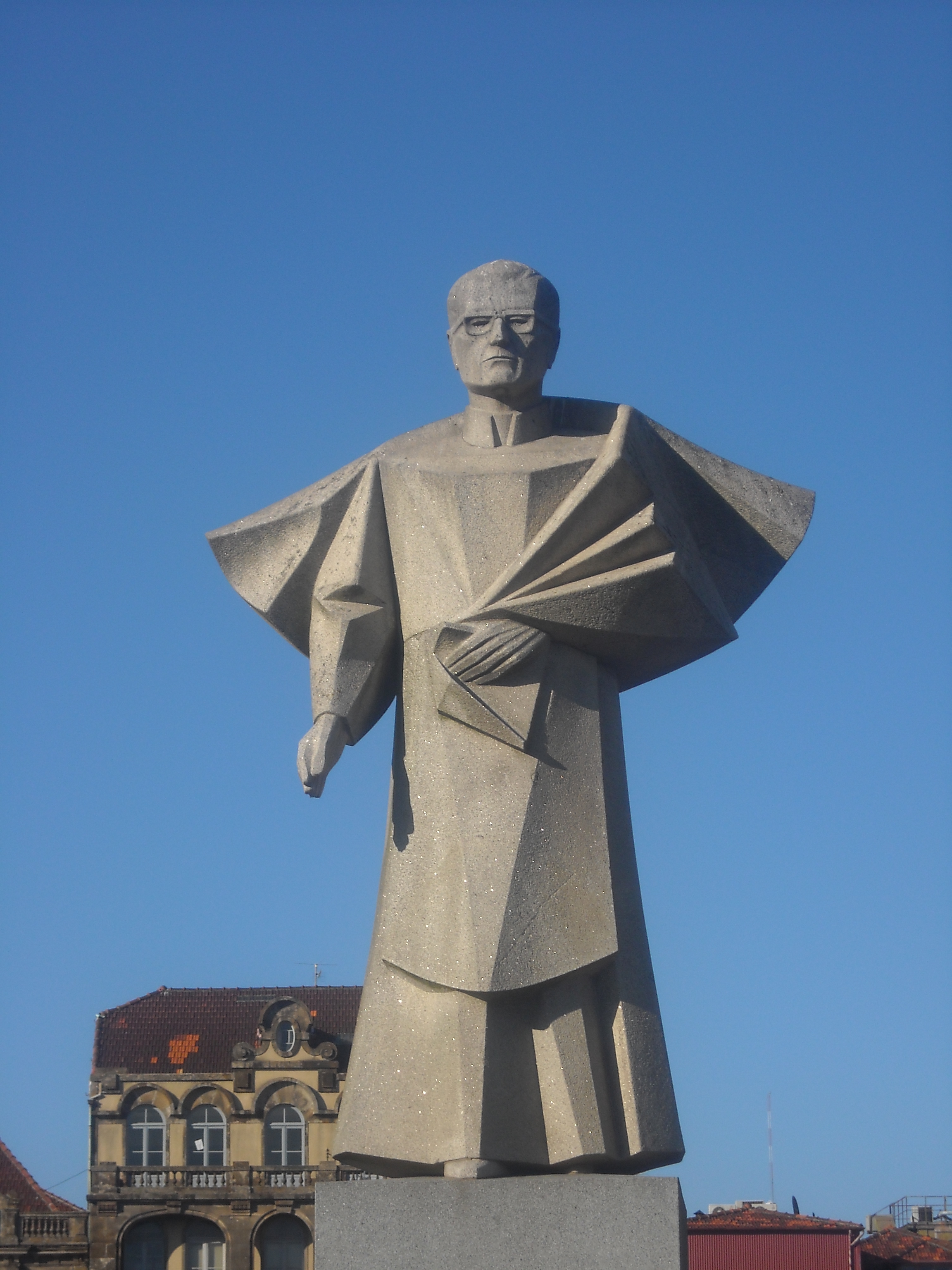
António Ferreira Gomes

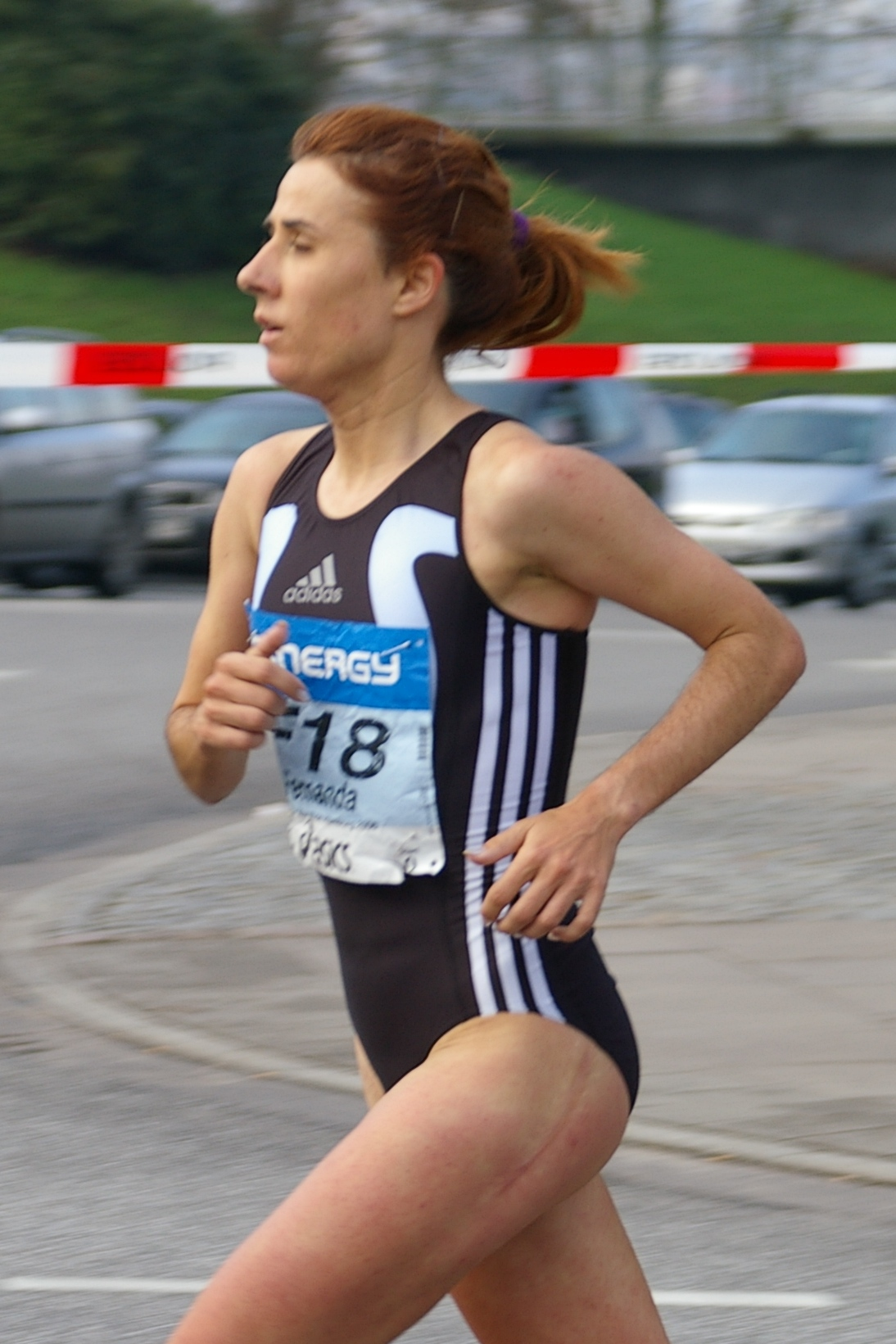
Fernanda Ribeiro

- José do Telhado (1818–1875) a Portuguese bandit.
- Vitorino Guimarães (1876–1957) an economist and politician & 91st Prime Minister of Portugal in 1925
- Neno Vasco (1878–1920) a poet, lawyer, journalist, anarchist, writer and ardent revolutionary syndicalist
- António Ferreira Gomes (1906–1989) a Portuguese Roman Catholic bishop
- António Barbosa de Melo (1932–2016) a Portuguese lawyer, politician and parliamentarian
- Rosário Gambôa (born 1956) a Portuguese academic and politician.
- Vitorino Silva (born 1971) known as Tino de Rans, a pavement-maker, TV personality and politician.

=== Sport ===
- António Oliveira (born 1952) a retired footballer with 306 club caps and 24 for Portugal.
- José Coelho (born 1961) a retired footballer with 407 club caps and 8 for Portugal.
- Agostinho Caetano (born 1966) a retired footballer with 320 club caps and 2 for Portugal.
- Fernanda Ribeiro (born 1969) a long-distance runner, gold medallist in the women's 10,000m at the 1996 Summer Olympics
- Abel Ferreira (born 1978) a former footballer and current coach of Palmeiras
- Hélder Ferreira (born 1980) a retired footballer with 320 club caps
- José Fonte (born 1983) a footballer with over 600 club caps and 49 for Portugal.
- Pedro Moreira (born 1983) a former footballer with 378 club caps.
- Nuno Morais (born 1984) a former footballer with 417 club caps.
- Vítor Silva (born 1984) a footballer with over 330 club caps.

== See also ==
- List of Catholic dioceses in Portugal

== Sources and external links ==
- GCatholic - former & titular bishopric
- Photos from Penafiel
- GCatholic - former cathedral
