= Campo 24 de Agosto station =

Light rail station on the Porto Metro in Porto, Portugal

Campo 24 de Agosto
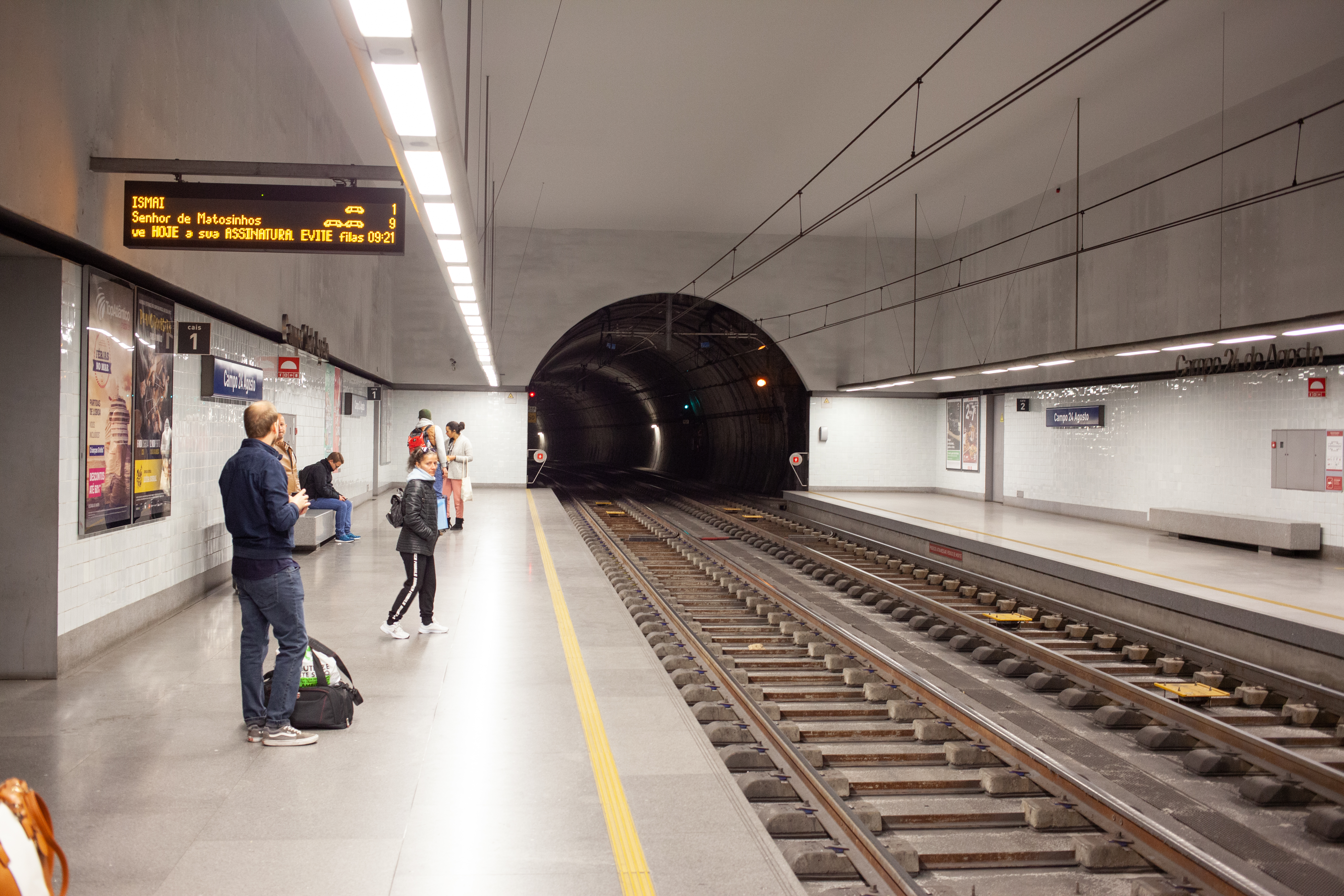
- The station's platforms, showing the layout with two side platforms flanking two tracks

General information
- Location: Porto; Portugal
- Coordinates: 41°8′55.50″N 8°35′55.50″W
- System: Porto Metro station
- Platforms: 2 side platforms
- Tracks: 2

Construction
- Structure type: Underground
- Accessible: Yes

History
- Opened: 5 June 2004

Services
Preceding station	Porto Metro	Following station
Bolhão towards Senhor de Matosinhos	Line A	Heroísmo towards Estádio do Dragão
Bolhão towards Póvoa de Varzim	Line B	Heroísmo towards Estádio do Dragão
Bolhão towards Póvoa de Varzim	Line Bx	Heroísmo towards Estádio do Dragão
Bolhão towards ISMAI	Line C	Heroísmo towards Campanhã
Bolhão towards Aeroporto	Line E Limited service	Heroísmo towards Estádio do Dragão
Bolhão towards Senhora da Hora	Line F	Heroísmo towards Fânzeres
Location

Campo 24 de Agosto is a light rail station on the Porto Metro system in Porto, Portugal. The station is underground, adjacent to the Campo 24 de Agosto square, from which it takes its name. It was opened in 2004.

The station is a through station on lines A, B, C, E and F, which run as one line within the metropolitan area. The next station to the west is Bolhão. To the east, the next station is Heroísmo. Campo 24 de Agosto station has two through tracks served by two side platforms. Like other stations in the common section of lines A, B, C, E and F, Campo 24 de Agosto sees a very frequent service, with up to 21 trains per hour in both directions.

The new station was opened on 5 June 2004 the extension of the initial line from its previous terminus at Trindade to a new terminus at Estádio do Dragão. The extension was initially served by lines A and B, with line C starting on 30 July 2005, line E on 27 May 2006, and line F on 2 January 2011.

During the excavations for the station, the remains of the Arca de Água de Mijavelhas, a water tank and well used to provide water supply to the city, were found. The ruins, which date from the 14th to the 19th centuries, were incorporated into the station, and are displayed there with explanatory panels.

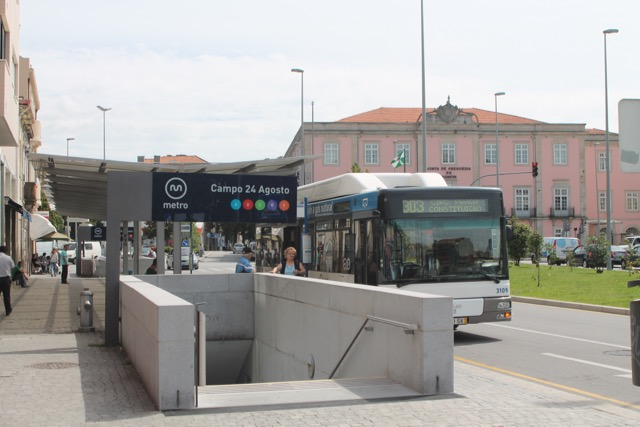
Station entrance, with connecting bus

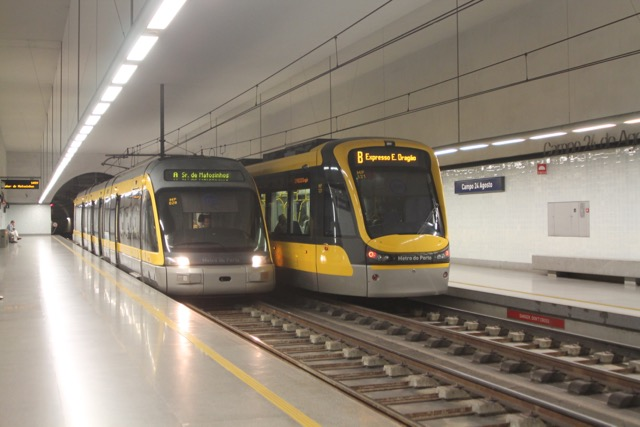
Station with Eurotram (left) and Flexity Swift (right) trams

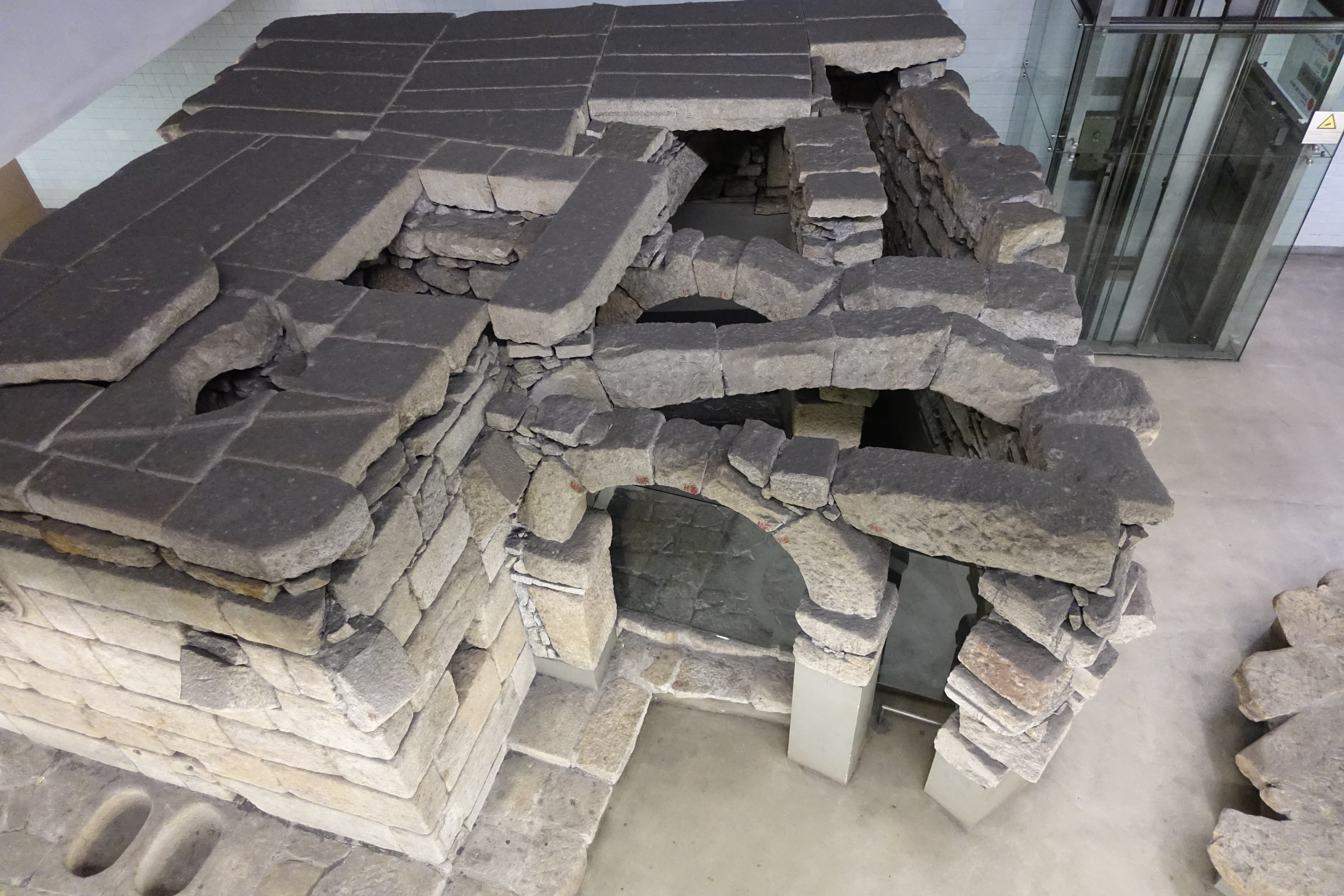
Arca de Água de Mijavelhas, preserved in the station
