= Heroísmo station =

Light rail station on the Porto Metro in Porto, Portugal

Heroísmo
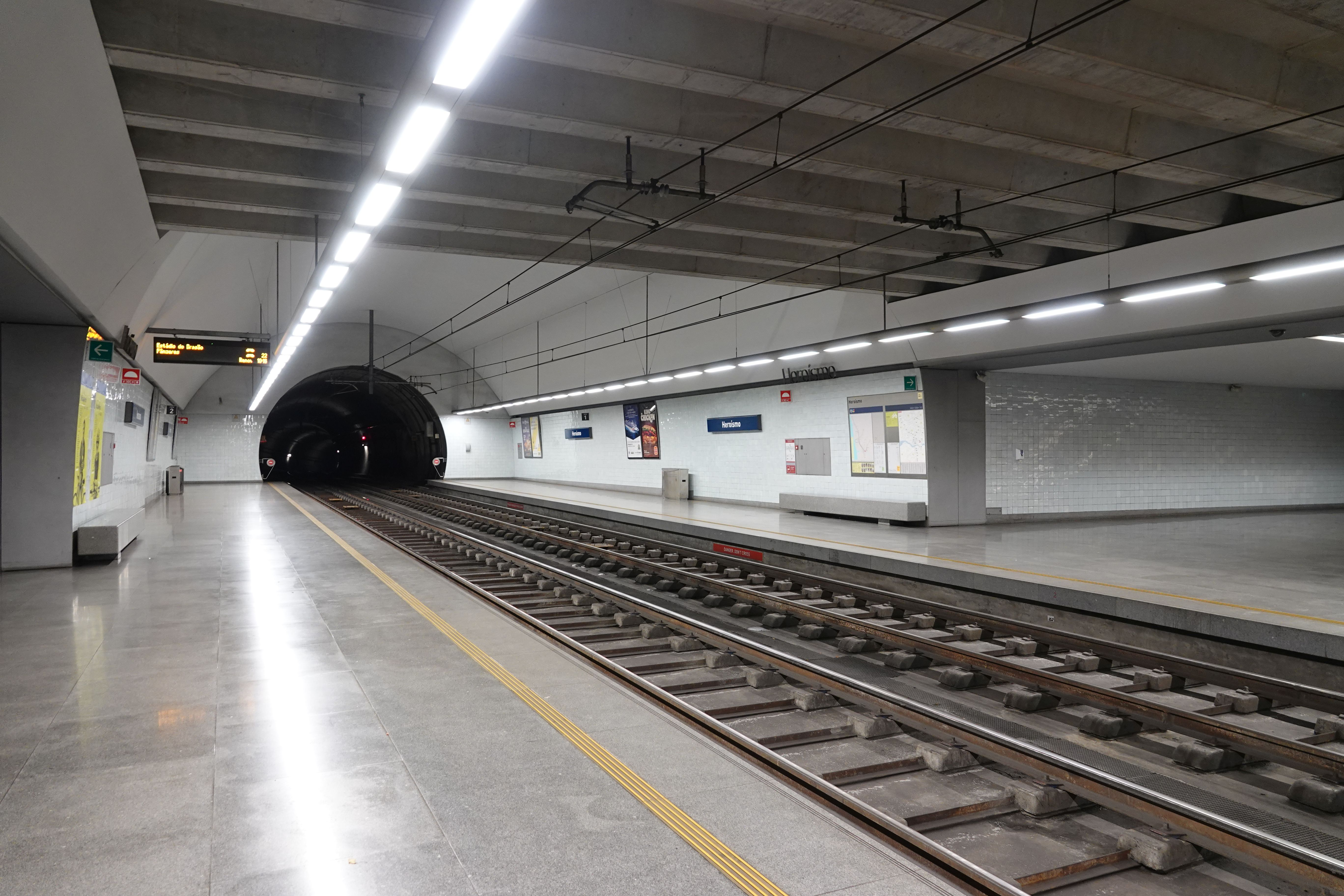
- The station's platforms, showing the layout with two side platforms flanking two tracks

General information
- Location: Porto; Portugal
- Coordinates: 41°08′48.09″N 8°35′34.78″W
- System: Porto Metro station
- Platforms: 2 side platforms
- Tracks: 2

Construction
- Structure type: Underground
- Accessible: Yes

History
- Opened: 5 June 2004

Services
Preceding station	Porto Metro	Following station
Campo 24 de Agosto towards Senhor de Matosinhos	Line A	Campanhã towards Estádio do Dragão
Campo 24 de Agosto towards Póvoa de Varzim	Line B	Campanhã towards Estádio do Dragão
Campo 24 de Agosto towards Póvoa de Varzim	Line Bx	Campanhã towards Estádio do Dragão
Campo 24 de Agosto towards ISMAI	Line C	Campanhã Terminus
Campo 24 de Agosto towards Aeroporto	Line E Limited service	Campanhã towards Estádio do Dragão
Campo 24 de Agosto towards Senhora da Hora	Line F	Campanhã towards Fânzeres
Location

Heroísmo is a light rail station on the Porto Metro system in Porto, Portugal. The station is underground, under the junction of Heroísmo and António Carneiro streets. It was opened in 2004.

The station is a through station on lines A, B, C, E and F, which run as one line within the metropolitan area. The next station to the west is Campo 24 de Agosto. To the east, the next station is Campanhã. Heroísmo station has two through tracks served by two side platforms. Like other stations in the common section of lines A, B, C, E and F, Heroísmo sees a very frequent service, with up to 21 trains per hour in both directions.

The new station was opened on 5 June 2004 the extension of the initial line from its previous terminus at Trindade to a new terminus at Estádio do Dragão. The extension was initially served by lines A and B, with line C starting on 30 July 2005, line E on 27 May 2006, and line F on 2 January 2011.

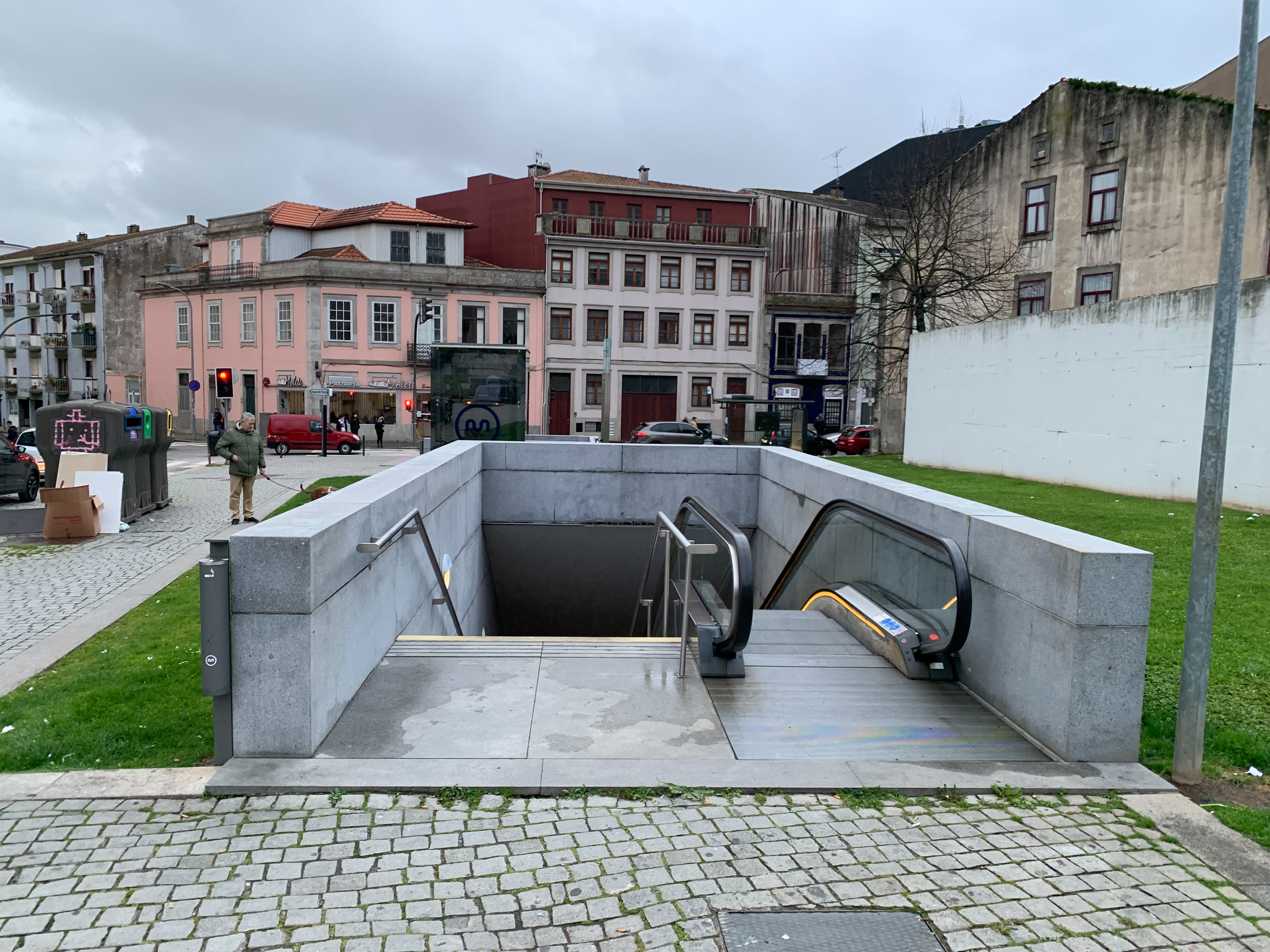
Station entrance

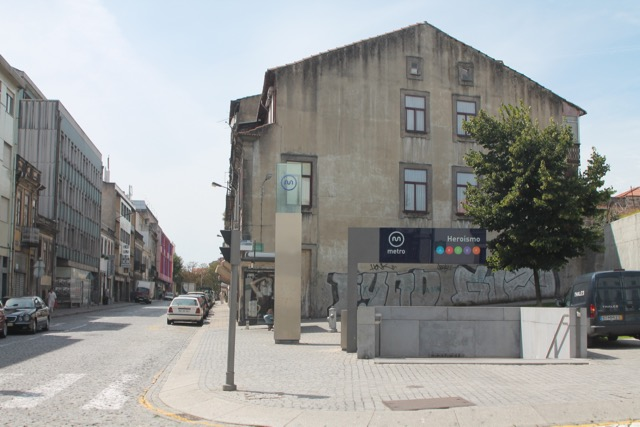
Station entrance
