= Bolhão station =

Light rail station on the Porto Metro in Porto, Portugal

Bolhão
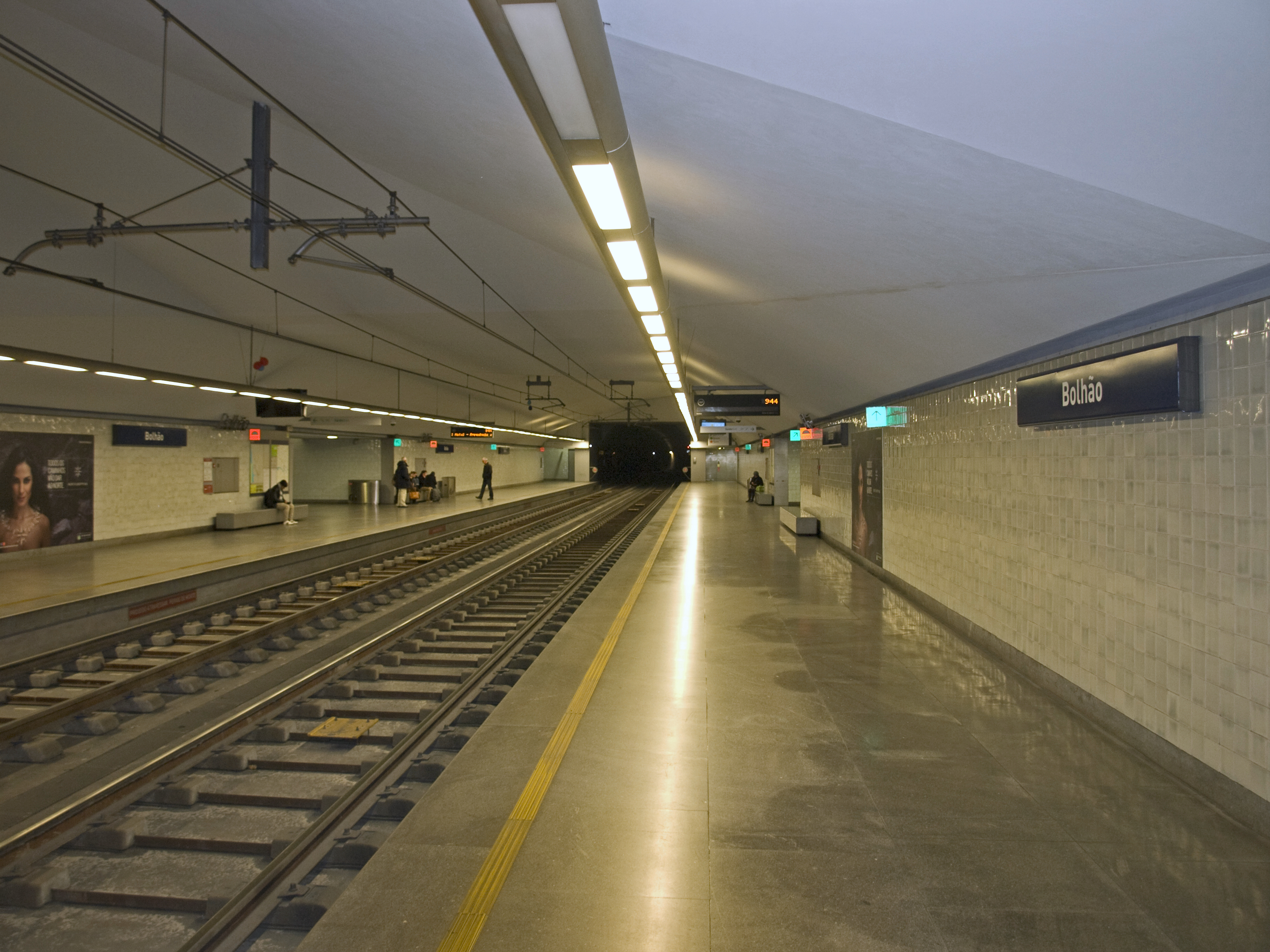
- The station's platforms

General information
- Location: Porto; Portugal
- Coordinates: 41°8′59″N 8°36′21.50″W
- System: Porto Metro station
- Platforms: 2 side platforms
- Tracks: 2

Construction
- Structure type: Underground
- Accessible: Yes

History
- Opened: 5 June 2004

Services
Preceding station	Porto Metro	Following station
Trindade towards Senhor de Matosinhos	Line A	Campo 24 de Agosto towards Estádio do Dragão
Trindade towards Póvoa de Varzim	Line B	Campo 24 de Agosto towards Estádio do Dragão
Trindade towards Póvoa de Varzim	Line Bx	Campo 24 de Agosto towards Estádio do Dragão
Trindade towards ISMAI	Line C	Campo 24 de Agosto towards Campanhã
Trindade towards Aeroporto	Line E Limited service	Campo 24 de Agosto towards Estádio do Dragão
Trindade towards Senhora da Hora	Line F	Campo 24 de Agosto towards Fânzeres
Location

Bolhão is a light rail station on the Porto Metro system in Porto, Portugal. The station is underground, adjacent to the Bolhão Market, from which it takes its name. It was opened in 2004.

The station is a through station on lines A, B, C, E and F, which run as one line within the metropolitan area. The next station to the west is Trindade. To the east, the next station is Campo 24 de Agosto. Bolhão station has two through tracks served by two side platforms. Like other stations in the common section of lines A, B, C, E and F, Bolhão sees a very frequent service, with up to 21 trains per hour in both directions.

The new station was opened on 5 June 2004 the extension of the initial line from its previous terminus at Trindade to a new terminus at Estádio do Dragão. The extension was initially served by lines A and B, with line C starting on 30 July 2005, line E on 27 May 2006, and line F on 2 January 2011.
