= Aliados station =

Underground light rail station on the Porto Metro in Porto, Portugal

Aliados
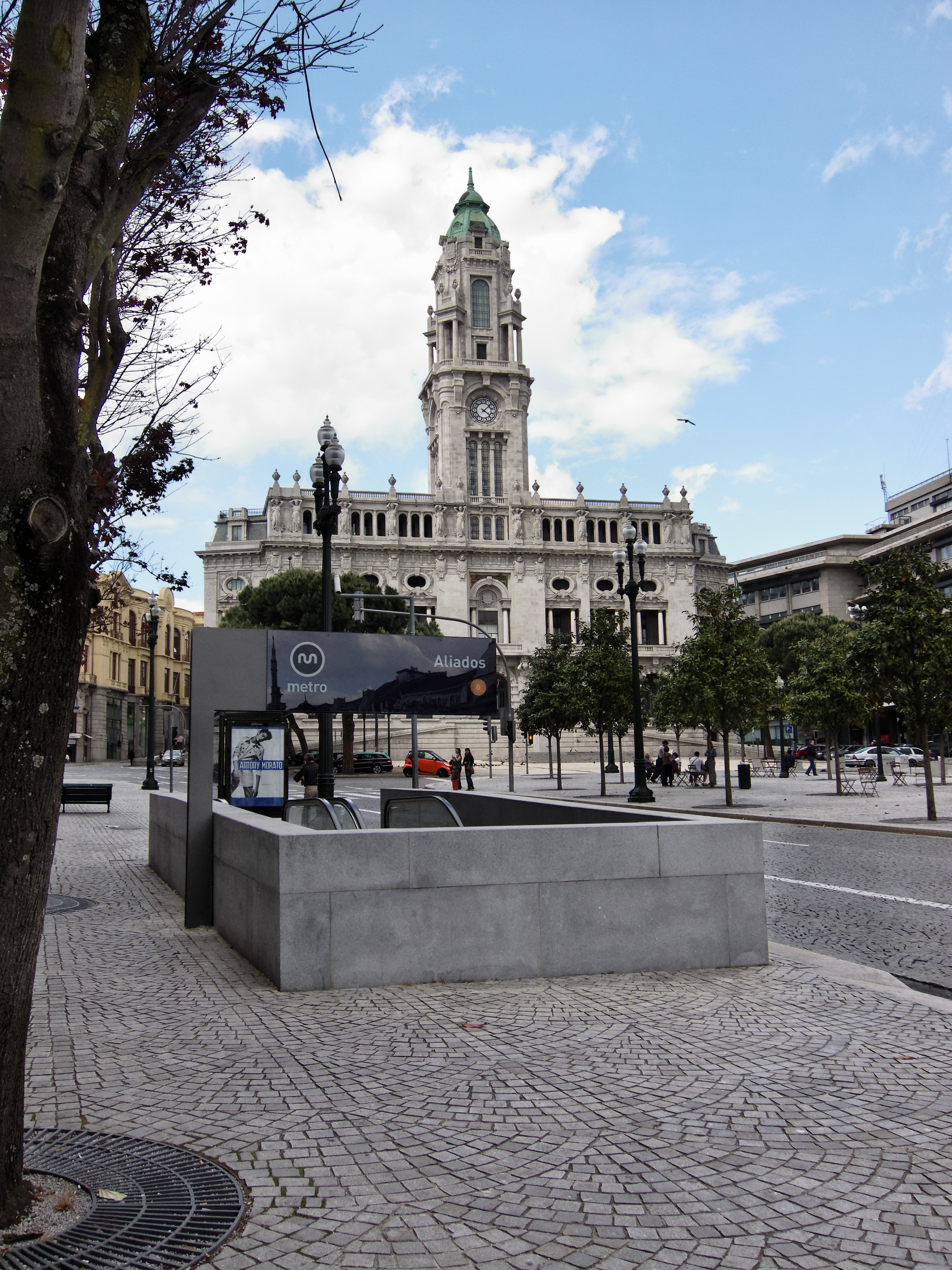
- Entrance to the station on the Avenida dos Aliados, with City Hall in background

General information
- Location: Porto; Portugal
- Coordinates: 41°08′55.13″N 8°36′39.06″W
- System: Porto Metro station
- Platforms: 2 side platforms
- Tracks: 2

Construction
- Structure type: Underground
- Accessible: Yes

History
- Opened: 17 September 2005

Services
| Preceding station | Porto Metro | Following station |
|---|---|---|
| Trindade towards Hospital de São João | Line D | São Bento towards Vila d'Este |
Nearby tram service
| Preceding station | Trams in Porto | Following station |
| Pç. Dom João I one-way operation | Line 22 | Pç. Filipa de Lencastre towards Carmo |
Location

Aliados is an underground light rail station on line D of the Porto Metro system in Porto, Portugal. It is situated to the south of Porto City Hall and under the Avenida dos Aliados, one of central Porto's main streets, from which it takes its name.

The central tunnelled section of line D, including Aliados station, opened on 17 September 2005, with trains initially running between Câmara de Gaia, to the south, and Pólo Universitário to the north. The line has since been extended from Câmara de Gaia to Vila d’Este, and from Pólo Universitário to Hospital de São João.

The station is preceded by Trindade and followed by São Bento stations. On weekdays, trains run every five to six minutes, declining to every 10 minutes on weekends and evenings.

The station platforms are underground, and there are two through tracks, each served by a side platform. Porto tram line 22 also stops at the Avenida dos Aliados near the station.

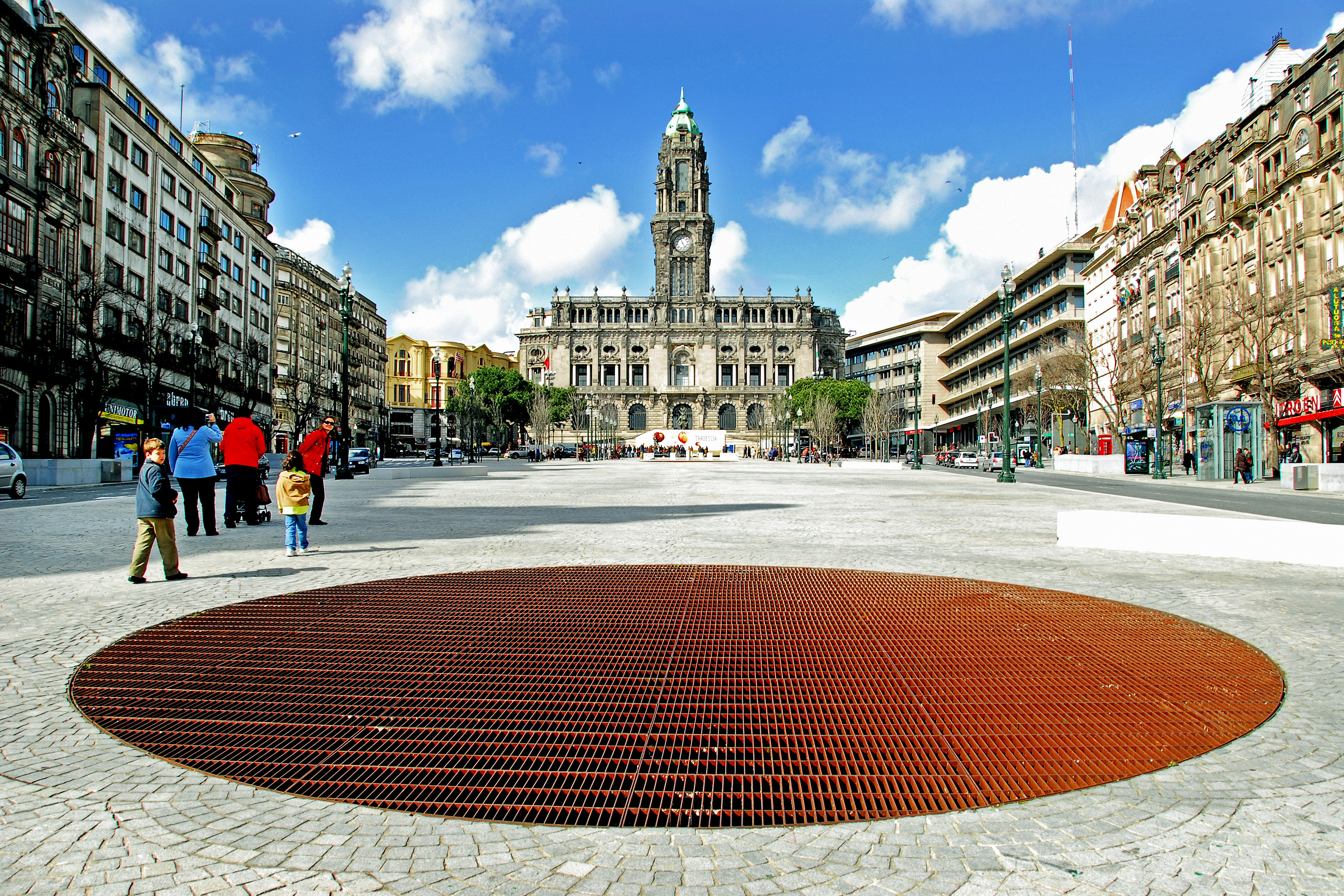
Ventillation grill in Avenida dos Aliados

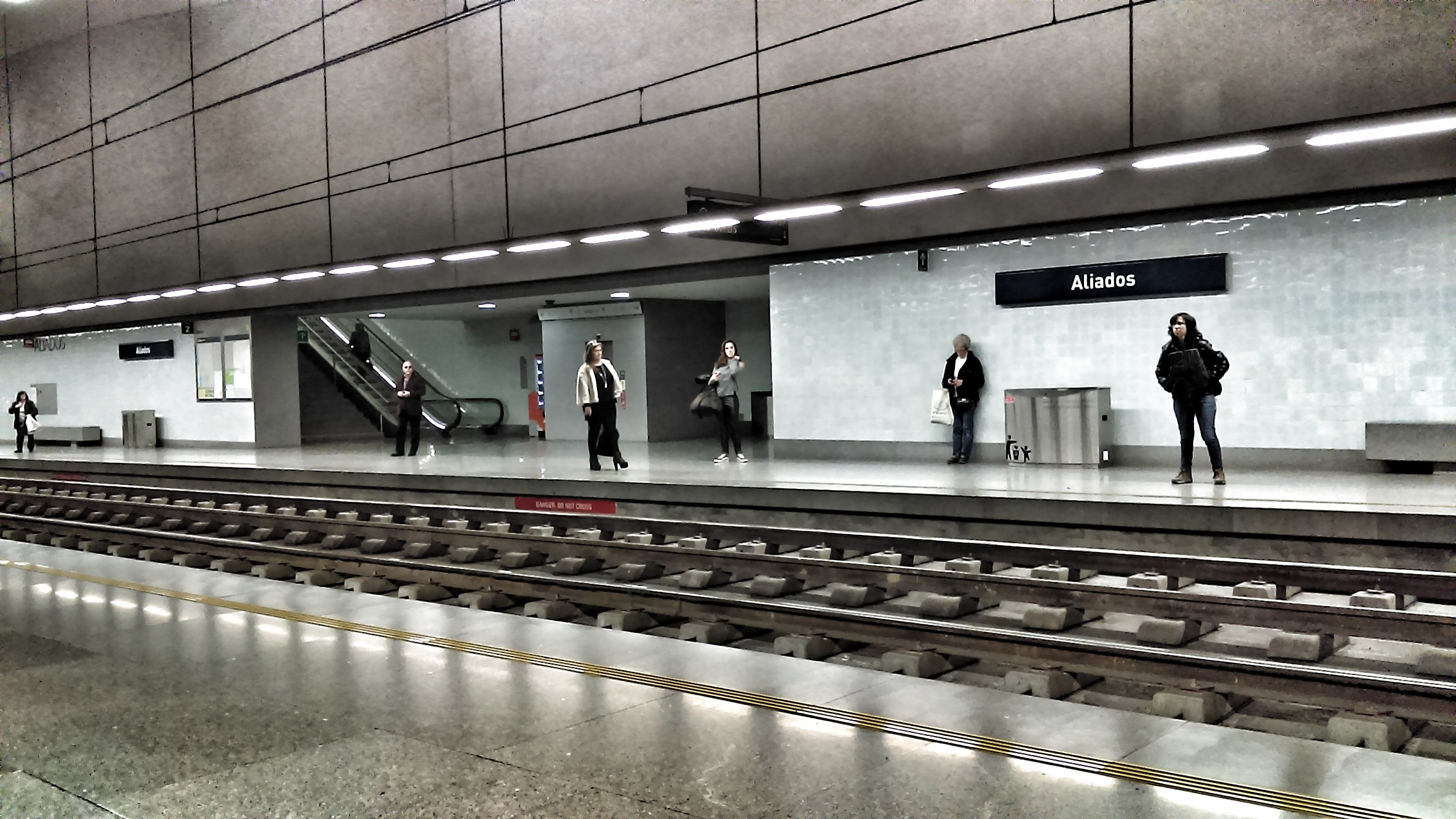
Station platforms

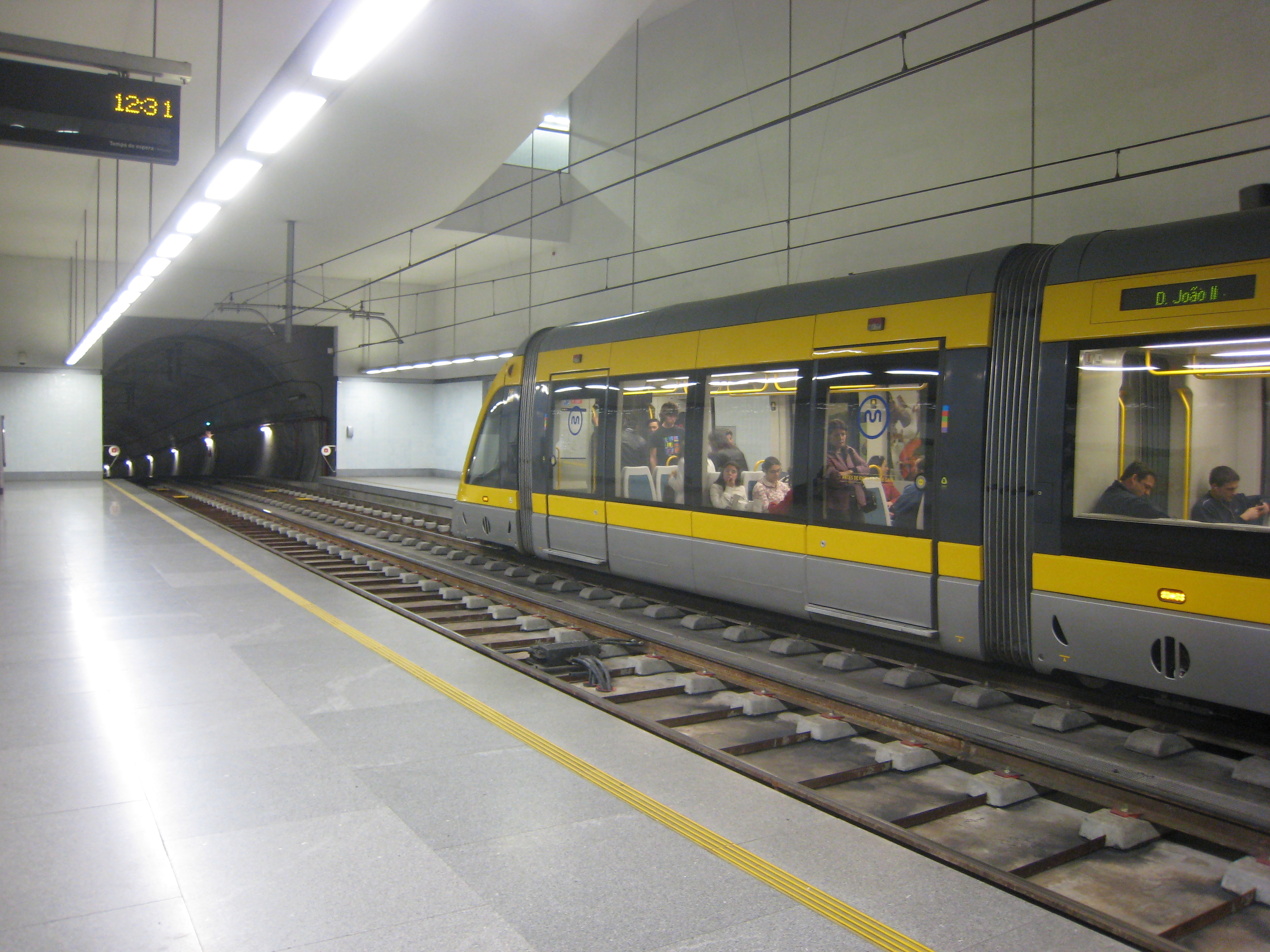
Eurotram in platform
