= ISMAI =

Portuguese university

Coordinates: 41.2678164°N 8.617116°W

ISMAI - Instituto Universitário da Maia is an institute of higher education formed in 1990 in Maia, Portugal.

Academic first degrees:

- Psychology
- Psychosocial Counseling
- Communication Sciences
- Physical Education and Sports
- Law (solicitors training)
- Accountancy
- Business Administration
- Public Relations
- Information Systems and Software
- Human Resources Management
- Technologies of Multimedia Communication
- Health and Safety in Work
- Telecommunication Networks
- Management Informatics
- Sports Management

Postgraduate degrees and Diplomas:

Doctoral Programmes:

- Univ. of Salamanca (Spain) PhD degree in "Clinical Neuropsychology" in collaboration with ISMAI
- Univ. of Vigo (Spain) PhD degree in "Fiscal Law"
- Univ. of Vigo PhD degree in "Muiltimedia Communication"

MA/MSc programmes in:

- Psychological Consultation, Counseling and Psychotherapy
- Prevention and Treatment of Addicitions
- Neuropsychological Evaluation and Intervention
- Psychopathology of Language and Communication
- Sexology
- Physical Education
- Communication in the Digital Era

ISMAI is served by its own station on the Porto Metro.

== See also ==
- List of colleges and universities in Portugal
- Higher education in Portugal
