= Trindade station (Porto Metro) =

Metro, and former narrow gauge railway, station in Porto, Portugal

Trindade
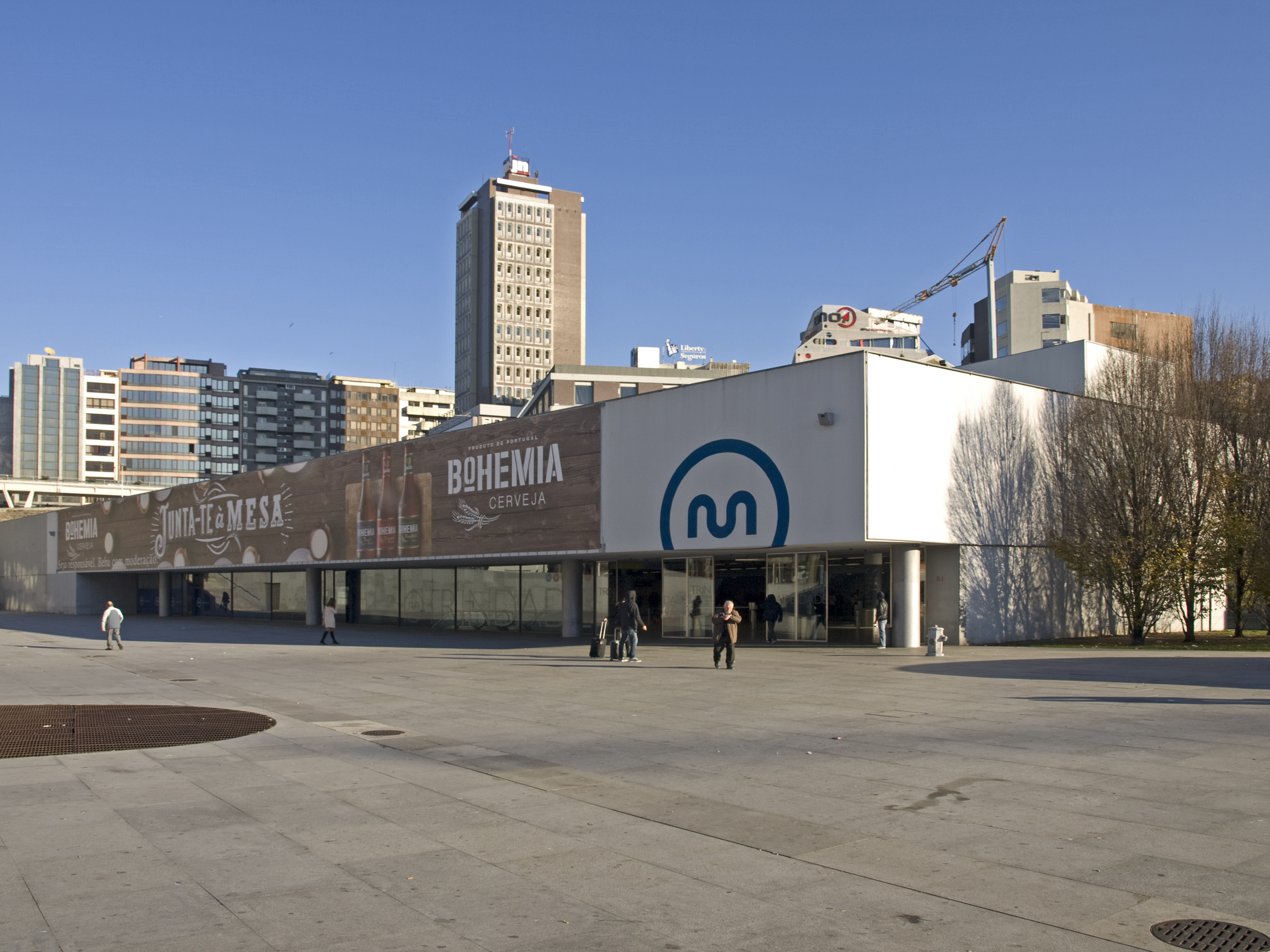

General information
- Location: Porto; Portugal
- Coordinates: 41°09′07″N 8°36′34″W
- System: Porto Metro station
- Platforms: 6 side platforms
- Tracks: 5

Construction
- Structure type: At Grade
- Accessible: Yes

History
- Opened: 7 December 2002

Services
Preceding station	Porto Metro	Following station
Lapa towards Senhor de Matosinhos	Line A	Bolhão towards Estádio do Dragão
Lapa towards Póvoa de Varzim	Line B	Bolhão towards Estádio do Dragão
Lapa towards Póvoa de Varzim	Line Bx	Bolhão towards Estádio do Dragão
Lapa towards ISMAI	Line C	Bolhão towards Campanhã
Faria Guimarães towards Hospital de São João	Line D	Aliados towards Vila d'Este
Lapa towards Aeroporto	Line E	Terminus
Lapa towards Aeroporto	Line E Limited service	Bolhão towards Estádio do Dragão
Lapa towards Senhora da Hora	Line F	Bolhão towards Fânzeres
Location

Trindade is a station on the Porto Metro system in Porto, Portugal. It is the system's principal interchange station, being the only station served by all lines. It is situated on the site of the former Porto-Trindade railway station, just to the north of City Hall. It was opened in 2002.

== History ==
=== Before 2001 ===
The modern metro station was built on the site of the former Trindade railway station. The former station served as the city terminus for a network of 1,000 mm (3 ft 3 3/8 in) gauge railways that served the area to the north of the city, including lines stretching as far as Matosinhos, Póvoa de Varzim, Vila Nova de Famalicão and Guimarães. It was opened on 30 October 1938 and was closed on 28 April 2001.

The northern sections of lines A, B, C, E and F of the Porto Metro make use of much of the trackbed of the old 1000mm gauge railway lines, including the reuse of the Lapa Tunnel (formerly known as the Trindade Tunnel), which provided the northern rail approach to the railway station, and now fulfils the same role for the metro station.

=== Since 2001 ===
After its closure, the former station was demolished and work started on the construction of the new metro station. The station was designed by the renowned Portuguese architect and Pritzker Prize winner Eduardo Souto de Moura, and was completed in 2002.

The section of the metro northwards from Trindade to Senhora da Hora, which follows the route of the former railway, was inaugurated on 7 December 2002 and commercial services started on 1 January 2003. This section was initially just served by line A operating between terminals at Trindade and Senhor de Matosinhos. The new tunnelled route eastwards from Trinidade to Estádio do Dragão was opened on 5 June 2004. Using the same tracks through Trindade, line B started operation on 13 March 2005, line C on 30 July 2005, line E on 27 May 2006, and line F on 2 January 2011.

In 2004, 14.8% of all ticket validations on the network were made at Trindade, down from 23.7% the previous year due to the opening of the Bolhão and Estádio do Dragão stations, but still comfortably the highest.

Meanwhile work was underway to build the separate line D route, which passes through Trindade station at a lower level. Trindade was the main entry point for the tunnel boring machines which excavated the tunnels for Line D in central Porto. This line opened through Trindade on 17 September 2005, with trains initially running between Câmara de Gaia and Pólo Universitário.

== Services ==
Trindade is the only station where lines A, B, C, E and F (which run as one line within the metropolitan area) intersect with Line D. It is in the centre of Porto and is the busiest station in the system by passenger numbers. The station is also served by a number of city bus routes.

On lines A, B, C, E, and F, Trindade is preceded by Bolhão and followed by Lapa, although some trains on line E to/from Aeroporto terminate here. Like other stations in the common section of lines A, B, C, E and F, Trindade sees a very frequent service on those lines, with up to 21 trains per hour in both directions.

On line D, Trindade is preceded by Aliados and followed by Faria Guimarães. On weekdays, trains run every five to six minutes, declining to every 10 minutes on weekends and evenings.

== Building ==
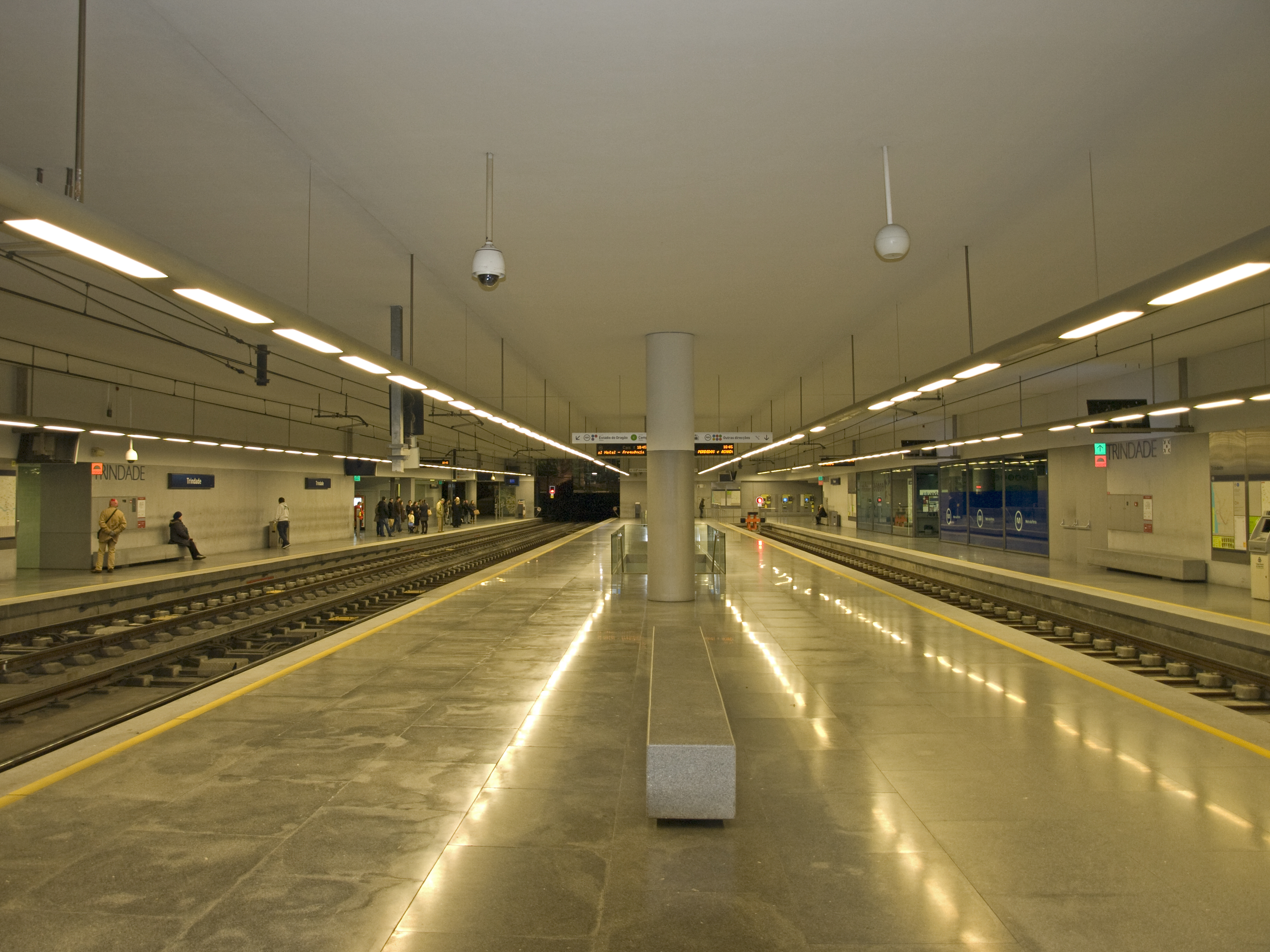
The platforms used by lines ABCEF, with the through tracks to the left and terminal track to right

The platforms for the ABCEF line are at ground level under a roof. On this level, there are two through tracks and one terminal track, served by four side platforms. The terminal track, with platforms on either side, was the former terminus for line Bx, which has since moved to Estádio do Dragão, and is now used by those trains on line E that terminate at Trindade. The main station access provides level access to the terminal and eastbound platforms, whilst a low level concourse provides access to the northbound platform.

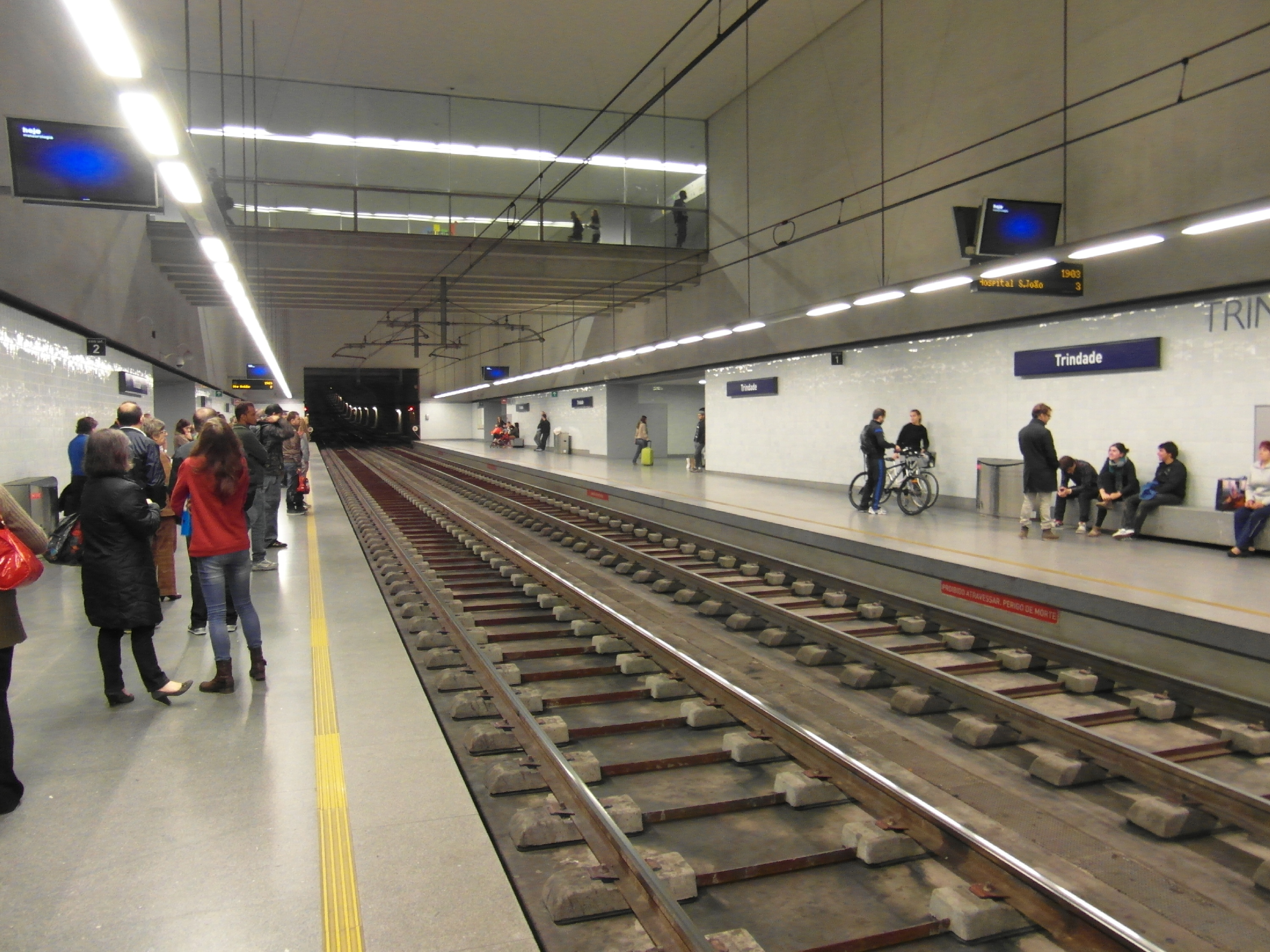
The platforms used by line D, with the concourse above

The line D platforms are underground, at a lower level than the concourse, from which they are accessed. At this level there are two through tracks, each served by a side platform. To the north of the station, a tunnelled single-track connection links the line D platforms to the Lapa Tunnel that carries lines ABCEF, thus allowing out of service trams to travel between line D and the other lines.

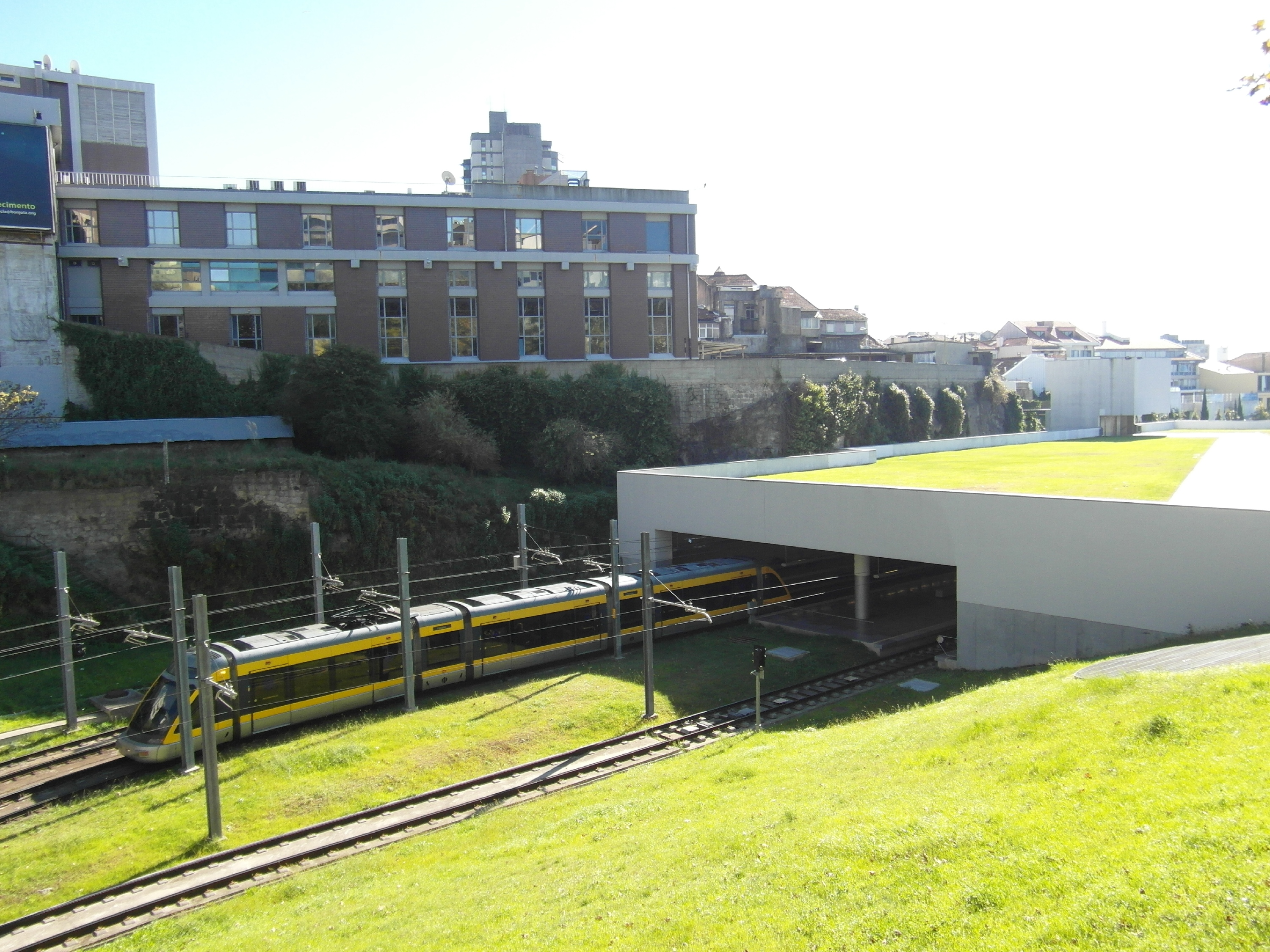
The station seen from above the entrance to the Lapa Tunnel

The station entrance and lower concourse are often used for fundraising and promotional events. In front of the main entrance is a paved trapezoidal plaza, bounded by the Rua de Camões, Rua do Alferes Malheiro and the single story station building. At the northern end of the plaza, a flight of stairs gives access to the roof of the station, which is grassed. On the opposite side of the station, stairs and a lift connect the station, the rooftop and an exit to the Travessa de Alferes Malheiro.
