= Campanhã station (Porto Metro) =

Light rail station on the Porto Metro in Porto, Portugal

Campanhã
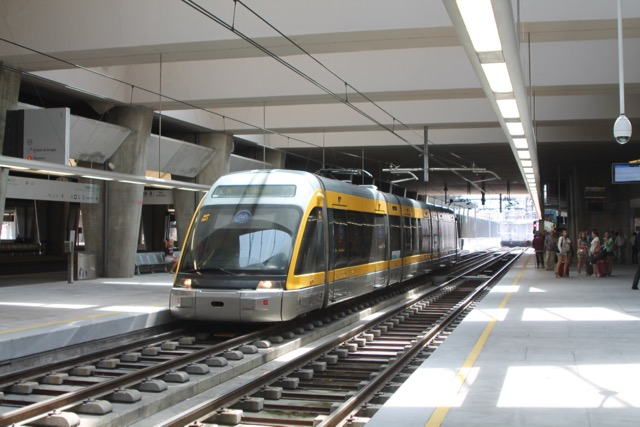
- The station's platforms, showing the layout with two side platforms flanking two tracks

General information
- Location: Porto; Portugal
- Coordinates: 41°09′03″N 8°35′08″W
- System: Porto Metro station
- Platforms: 2 side platforms
- Tracks: 2

Construction
- Structure type: At Grade
- Accessible: Yes

History
- Opened: 5 June 2004

Services
Preceding station	Porto Metro	Following station
Heroísmo towards Senhor de Matosinhos	Line A	Estádio do Dragão Terminus
Heroísmo towards Póvoa de Varzim	Line B	Estádio do Dragão Terminus
Heroísmo towards Póvoa de Varzim	Line Bx	Estádio do Dragão Terminus
Heroísmo towards ISMAI	Line C	Terminus
Heroísmo towards Aeroporto	Line E Limited service	Estádio do Dragão Terminus
Heroísmo towards Senhora da Hora	Line F	Estádio do Dragão towards Fânzeres
Location

Campanhã is a light rail station on the Porto Metro system in Porto, Portugal. The station is on the surface, adjacent to the Campanhã railway station, Porto's principal main line station. It was opened in 2004.

The station is a through station on lines A, B, E and F, and acts as the eastern terminus for trains on line C. These lines run as one line within the metropolitan area, and the next station to the west is Heroísmo. To the east, the next station is Estádio do Dragão. Campanhã station is located on the surface, next to the main line railway platforms. It has two through tracks served by two side platforms. Like other stations in the common section of lines A, B, C, E and F, Campanhã sees a very frequent service, with up to 21 trains per hour in both directions.

The new station was opened on 5 June 2004 the extension of the initial line from its previous terminus at Trindade to a new terminus at Estádio do Dragão. The extension was initially served by lines A and B, with line C starting on 30 July 2005, line E on 27 May 2006, and line F on 2 January 2011. The station became the terminus of line C on 6 September 2010, when the line was cut back from Estádio do Dragão.

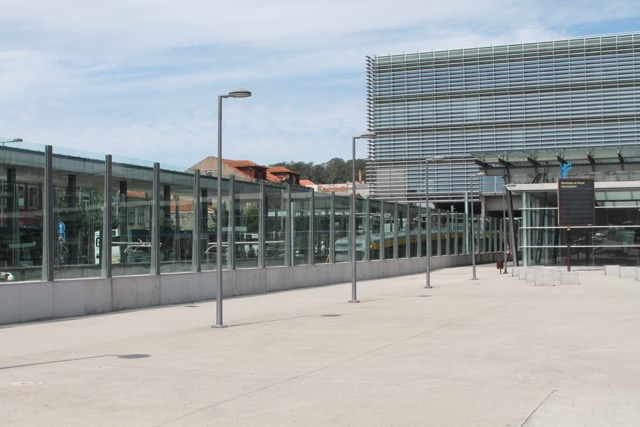
Metro station seen from the south, with tunnel entrance

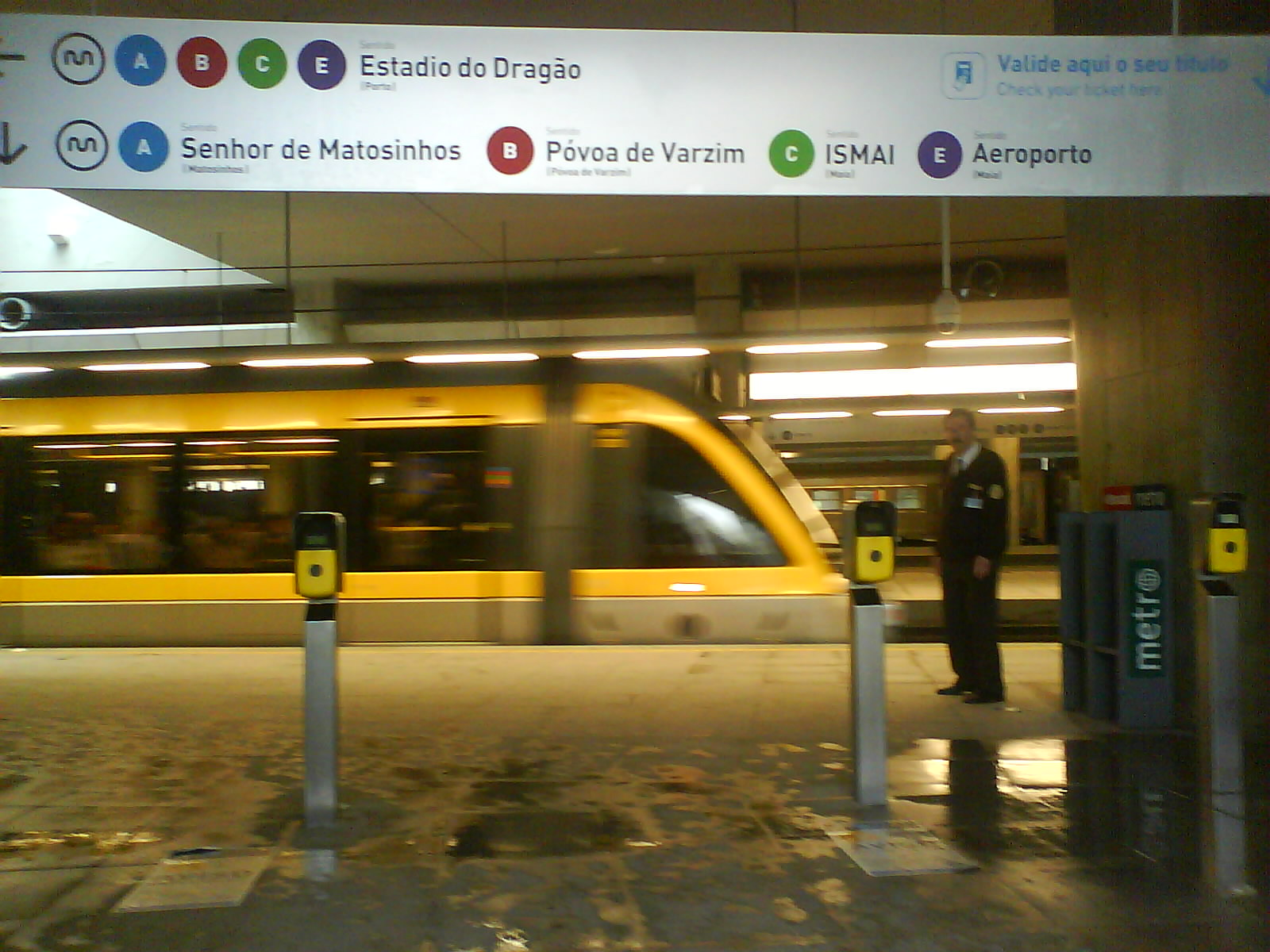
Access to the platforms (in 2008 before line changes)

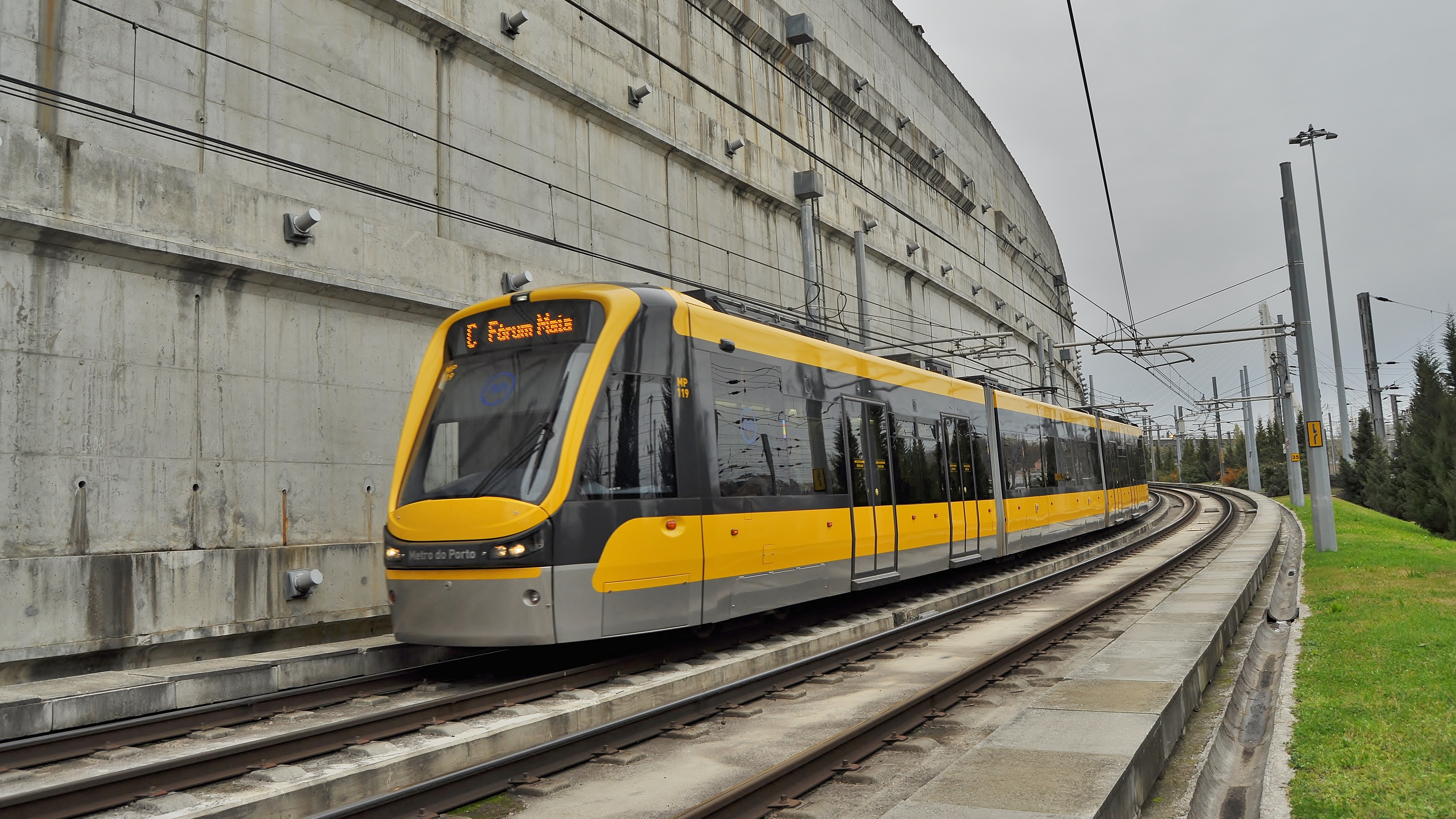
The northern approach to the metro station
