= Fânzeres =

- Civil parish
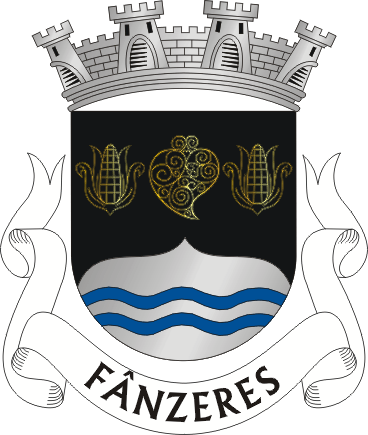
- Coat of arms

- Coordinates: 41°10′N 8°32′W
- Country: Portugal
- Region: Norte
- Metropolitan area: Porto
- District: Porto
- Municipality: Gondomar
- Disbanded: 2013

Area
  - Total: 8.05 km^{2} (3.11 sq mi)

Population (2011)
  - Total: 23,108
  - Density: 2,900/km^{2} (7,400/sq mi)
- Time zone: UTC+00:00 (WET)
  - Summer (DST): UTC+01:00 (WEST)
- Website: http://www.jf-fanzeres.pt/

Fânzeres is a town and a former civil parish in the municipality of Gondomar, Portugal. In 2013, the parish merged into the new parish Fânzeres e São Pedro da Cova. Its population is around 20,000.

Fânzeres station, the terminus of line F of the Porto Metro, is situated on Av. Prof. Dr. Anibal Cavaco Silva in the town.
