= Estádio do Dragão station =

Light rail station on the Porto Metro in Porto, Portugal

Estádio do Dragão
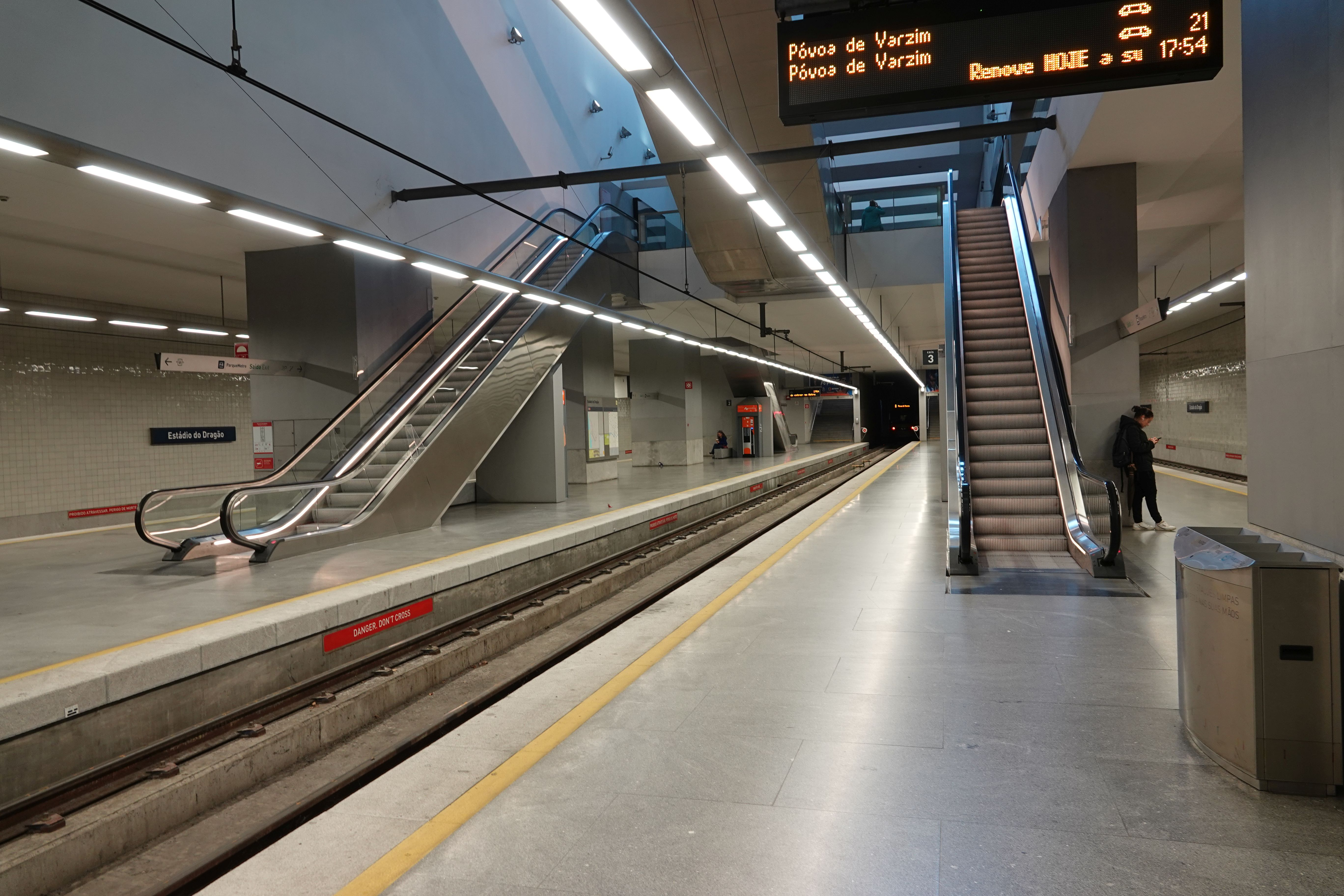
- The station's platform level, showing the layout with two island platforms and three tracks accessed from a higher level concourse

General information
- Location: Porto; Portugal
- Coordinates: 41°9′38″N 8°34′55″W
- System: Porto Metro station
- Platforms: 2 island platforms
- Tracks: 3

Construction
- Structure type: Underground
- Accessible: Yes

History
- Opened: 5 June 2004

Services
Preceding station	Porto Metro	Following station
Campanhã towards Senhor de Matosinhos	Line A	Terminus
Campanhã towards Póvoa de Varzim	Line B	Terminus
Campanhã towards Póvoa de Varzim	Line Bx	Terminus
Campanhã towards Aeroporto	Line E Limited service	Terminus
Campanhã towards Senhora da Hora	Line F	Contumil towards Fânzeres
Location

Estádio do Dragão, known during its planning stage as Antas, is a light rail station on the Porto Metro system in Porto, Portugal. The station is underground, adjacent to the Estádio do Dragão football stadium, from which it takes its name. It was opened in 2004, in time for that year's European Football Championship, for which the stadium hosted games.

The station is a through station on line F, and acts as the eastern terminus for trains on lines A, B and E. Lines A, B, E and F run as one line within the metropolitan area to the west of Estádio do Dragão, and the next station in that direction is Campanhã. To the east on line F, the next station is Contumil. Estádio do Dragão station is located underground, between the stadium and the main line railway tracks north out of Campanhã railway station. It has three through tracks served by two island platforms. Access is by lift or stairs via a higher level concourse.

The new station was opened on 5 June 2004 as the terminus of an extension of the initial line from its previous terminus at Trindade. The extension was initially served by lines A and B, with line C starting on 30 July 2005, line E on 27 May 2006, and line F on 2 January 2011. Line C ceased to serve the station on 6 September 2010, when its eastern terminus was moved to Campanhã.

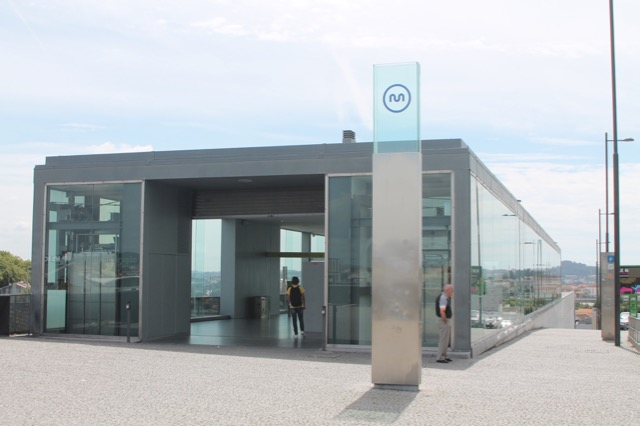
Station entrance

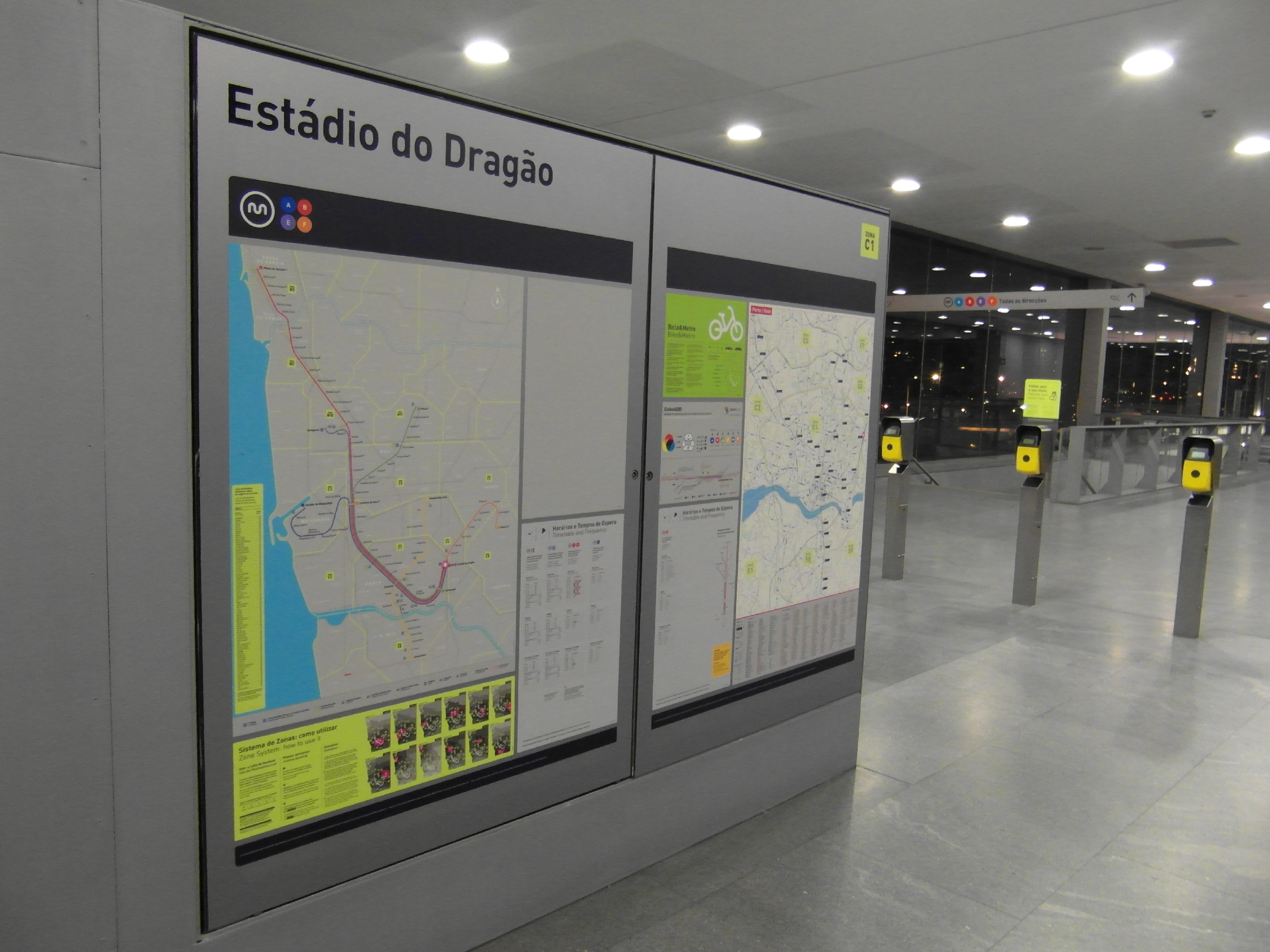
Information panels

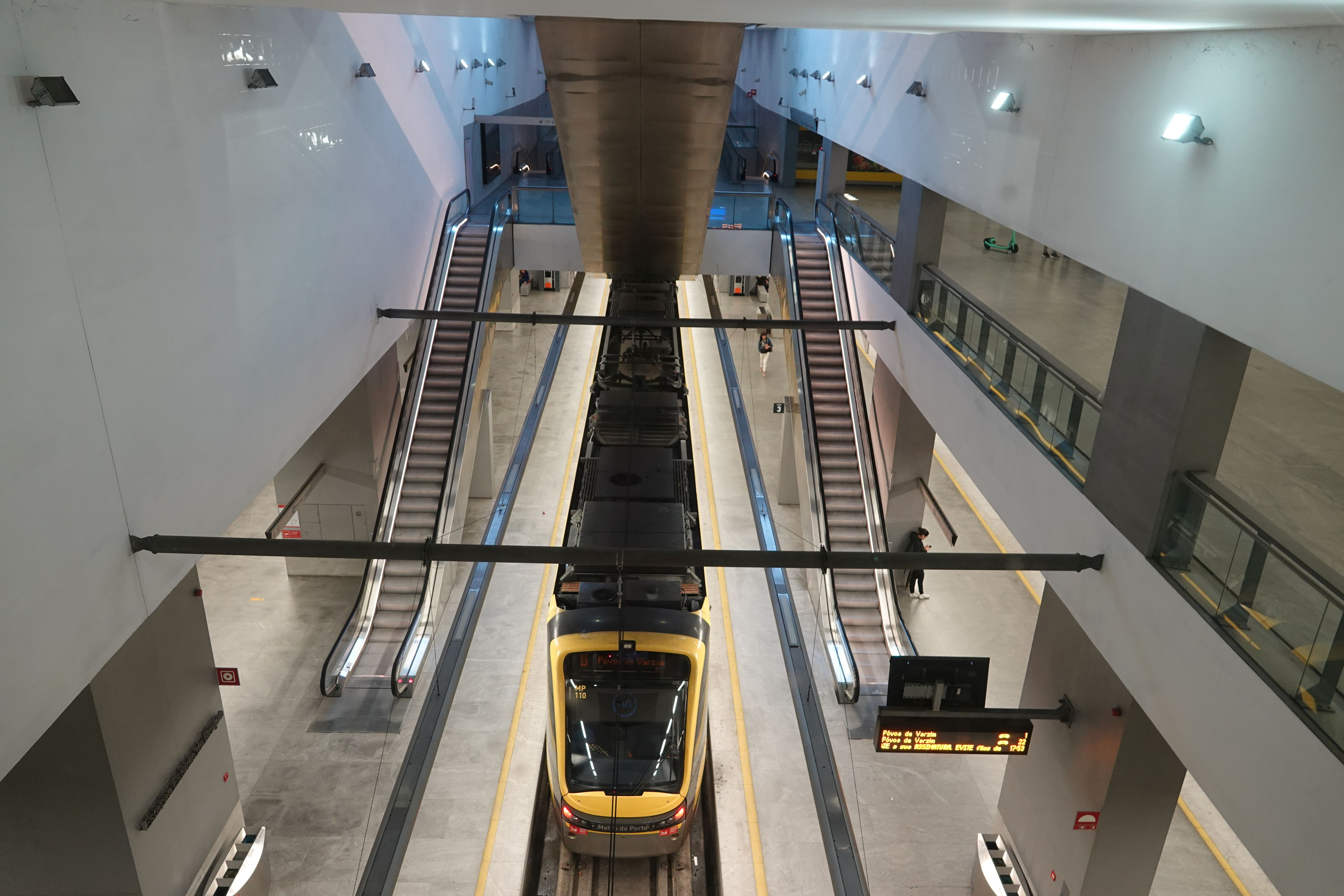
Looking down into the station
