= ISMAI station =

Light rail station in Maia, Portugal

ISMAI
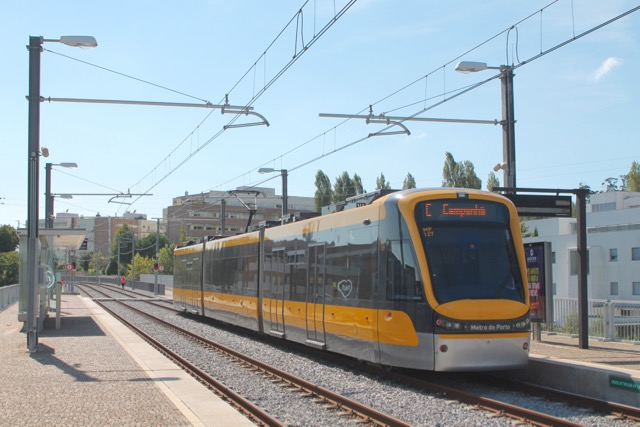
- Track and platforms

General information
- Location: Maia; Portugal
- Coordinates: 41°16′08″N 8°36′55″W
- System: Porto Metro station
- Platforms: 2 side platforms
- Tracks: 2

Construction
- Structure type: Embanked
- Accessible: Yes

History
- Opened: 31 March 2006

Services
Preceding station	Porto Metro	Following station
Terminus	Line C	Castêlo da Maia towards Campanhã
Location

ISMAI is a light rail station on the Porto Metro system serving the Instituto Universitário da Maia (ISMAI) in the municipality of Maia, Portugal. The station is the terminus of line C of the Metro, which provides a direct connection to the centre of the city of Porto. It was opened in 2006.

== History ==
The station was built in the corridor of a section of the former narrow gauge Porto to Guimarães railway line. This section of the line was built, between 1927 and 1932, to connect the pre-existing narrow gauge lines at Senhora da Hora and Trofa, thus allowing through trains to run between Guimarães and Porto. Prior to this section of line being built, passengers making this journey were forced to change between narrow and Iberian gauge trains at Trofa.

In the 1990s it was decided to close the narrow gauge lines to the north of Porto. The Trofa to Guimarães section of the line was to be converted to Iberian gauge and connected to the existing line into Porto-Campanhã railway station, whilst the corridors of the remaining lines were to be used in the creation of the Porto Metro, a standard gauge light rail system. On 24 February 2002, the section between Senhora da Hora and Trofa was closed.

The Porto Metro opened in sections, reaching the new ISMAI station on 31 March 2006. Work on the remaining section of the old narrow gauge line from ISMAI to Trofa stalled, and it remains unserved, although the Porto Metro provides a bus link between the two points.

== Services ==
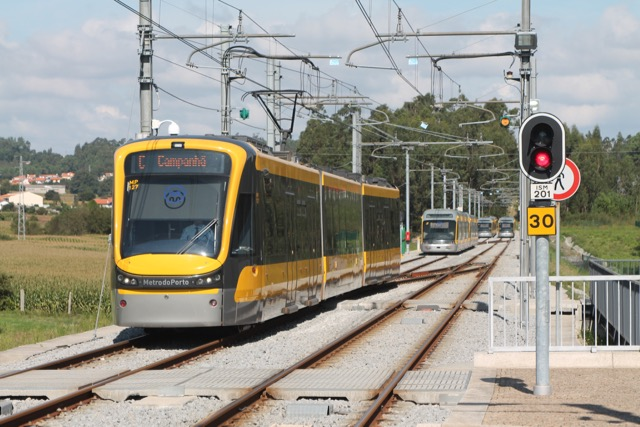
Trams in the turnback sidings

ISMAI is the terminus of line C, but some trains on the line terminate at Fórum da Maia, resulting in ISMAI having a service of between two and four trains per hour in both directions. The next station after departure is Castêlo da Maia.

The platforms are on an embankment, with two through tracks served by two side platforms accessible by stairs and lifts. Trains arrive on one platform, and run past the station to reverse before departing from the other platform.
