= Porto Metro =

Light rail system in Porto, Portugal

- Logo of the Porto Metro

- Flexity Outlook Eurotram and Flexity Swift of the Porto Metro

Overview
- Native name: Metro do Porto
- Owner: Government-owned corporation
- Locale: Porto; Gondomar; Maia; Matosinhos; Póvoa de Varzim; Vila do Conde; Vila Nova de Gaia
- Transit type: Light rail
- Number of lines: 6
- Number of stations: 85
- Daily ridership: 259,014 (2025)
- Annual ridership: 94,540,055 (2025)
- Website: Metro do Porto

Operation
- Began operation: 7 December 2002; 23 years ago
- Operator: ViaPorto
- Number of vehicles: 120

Technical
- System length: 70 km (43 mi)
- Track gauge: 1,435 mm (4 ft 8 1/2 in) standard gauge
- Electrification: 750 V DC OHLE

The Porto Metro (Portuguese: Metro do Porto) is a light rail network in Porto, Portugal and a key part of the city's public transport system. It runs underground in central Porto and above ground into the city's suburbs while using low-floor tram vehicles. The first parts of the system have been in operation since 2002.

The network has 6 lines and reaches seven municipalities within the metropolitan Porto area: Porto, Gondomar, Maia, Matosinhos, Póvoa de Varzim, Vila do Conde and Vila Nova de Gaia. It currently has a total of 85 operational stations across 70 kilometres (43 mi) of double track commercial line. Most of the system is at ground level or elevated, but 8.3 kilometres (5.2 mi) of the network is underground. The system is run by ViaPORTO.

The Porto Metro has received the Veronica Rudge Green Prize in Urban Design from Harvard University's Graduate School of Design in 2013.

== History ==
During the 1990s, political leaders started advocating for a partially underground electrified railway transport system to service the city of Porto and the surrounding municipalities. This culminated in the founding of Metro do Porto S.A. in 1993 and the start of planning and construction of the first expansion phase of the Porto Metro. This first phase was deemed completed in 2006 and saw the creation of lines A, B, C, D and E.

The project included the conversion of sections of the narrow gauge railway lines of Linha do Porto à Póvoa e Famalicão and Linha de Guimarães, including the section between Senhora da Hora and Trindade nowadays shared by 5 different lines. In 2001, train services came to an end as construction started.

Line A (blue line) was the first line to open on 7 December 2002, running between Senhor de Matosinhos and Trindade in central Porto. On 5 June 2004, the line was extended to Estádio do Dragão, Porto's largest football stadium, in time for the Euro 2004 Football championship.

On 3 March 2005, Line B (red line) opened between Estádio do Dragão and Pedras Rubras. The remaining section between Pedras Rubras and Póvoa de Varzim was opened a year later in March 2006. This line replaced the Linha do Porto à Póvoa e Famalicão, a narrow gauge railway between Porto and Póvoa de Varzim. The section between Póvoa de Varzim and Famalicão had already been closed in 1995 and was not included in the project. Instead, it got decommissioned and converted into a bicycle trail. In July 2017, an infill station called VC Fashion Outlet - Modivas was added.

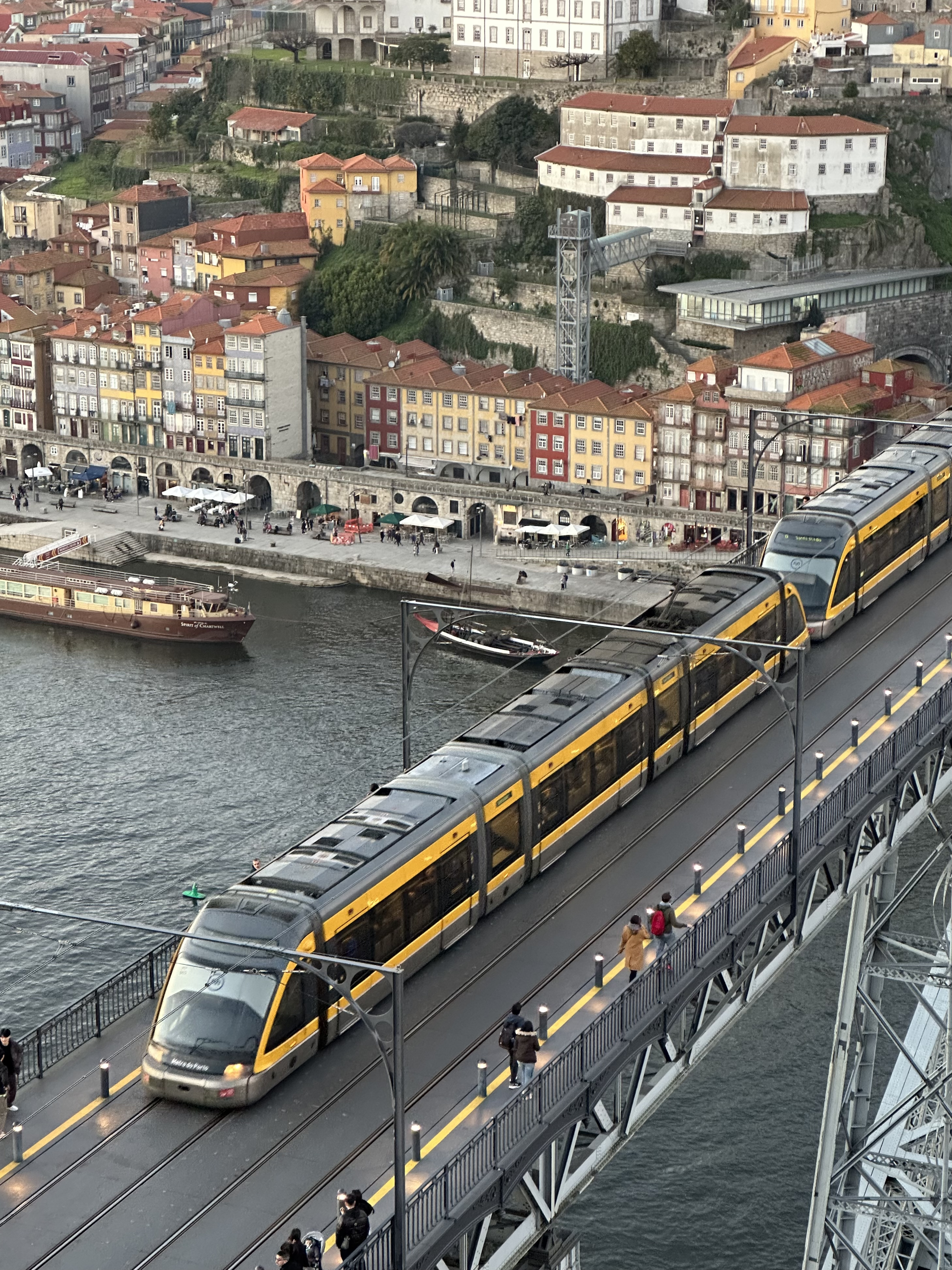
Tram crossing the Dom Luís I Bridge.

Line C (green line) opened on 30 July 2005, until Fórum da Maia in the centre of Maia and was extended until ISMAI in March 2006. Line C was built using part of the Guimarães line between Senhora da Hora and ISMAI. A section of this railway line between ISMAI and Lousado was decommissioned and expected to be serviced by the Porto Metro until Trofa, but as of 2024 it was only serviced by busses. The Guimarães line continued to have train services from Lousado via Linha do Minho.

Line D (yellow line) proved the most problematic to excavate and opened on 17 September 2005 between Câmara de Gaia in Vila Nova de Gaia and Pólo Universitário in the north. In the northern end, the São João Hospital and IPO stations, were not brought into service until March 2006 due to safety concerns. In the southern end, the line was expanded until D. João II in May 2008 and then to Santo Ovídio in October 2011. In June 2024, the line was extended southwards by 3.15km with three new stations added, Manuel Leão, Hospital Santos Silva and Vila d'Este.

Line E (violet line) opened on 27 May 2006, connecting the Airport Francisco Sá Carneiro and Campanhã. Several weeks later, the line was extended to Estádio do Dragão.

Line F (orange line) opened on 2 January 2011, connecting the Porto city centre to the Gondomar region in the east, this line runs between Senhora da Hora and Fânzeres.

The Metro do Porto company managed and operated the Funicular of Guindais between 2004 and 2019. Management was transferred to Porto municipality in 2019 and to a municipal company called STCP Serviços in 2022.

== Corporate affairs ==
=== Key figures ===
Between 2016 and 2023, the number of yearly passengers using the Porto Metro system has gradually increased, with the exception of the years affected by the COVID-19 pandemic. On the supply side, the number of yearly train trips has varied, and as of 2023 it had not recovered to the peak of 370,000 in 2019. Porto Metro's punctuality is high, bottoming out at 93% in 2019. Investment increased from 2021 onward, when construction started on Line G and on the expansion of Line D.

	2016	2017	2018	2019	2020	2021	2022	2023
Passengers (M)	58	61	63	71	39	42	65	79
Passenger km (M)	297	312	321	376	204	217	348	425
Train trips (k)	353	352	341	370	307	310	342	355
Train km (M)	5.2	5.3	5.1	5.4	4.6	4.5	5	5.2
Punctuality (%) (Note: Share of services with a delay of over 3 minutes.)	100%	100%	97%	93%	95%	98%	99%	97%
Investment (€M) (Note: Investment in modernisation or new infrastructure.)	0	0	1.8	3	2.5	43	98.5	83.2
Source: Autoridade da Mobilidade e dos Transportes

=== Costs and financial results ===
As of 2007, the total cost of the Porto Metro public transport system stands at 3.5 billion euros - over 1% of Portugal's GDP. The first phase of the project alone, which was led by the mayors of several Grande Porto (Greater Porto) municipalities including Valentim Loureiro as a chairman of the state-owned company, was 140% more expensive than initially planned – a slippage of over 1,5 billion euros. The Porto Metro state-owned company has reported losses every year, reaching a record loss of 122 million euros in 2006.

== Rolling stock ==
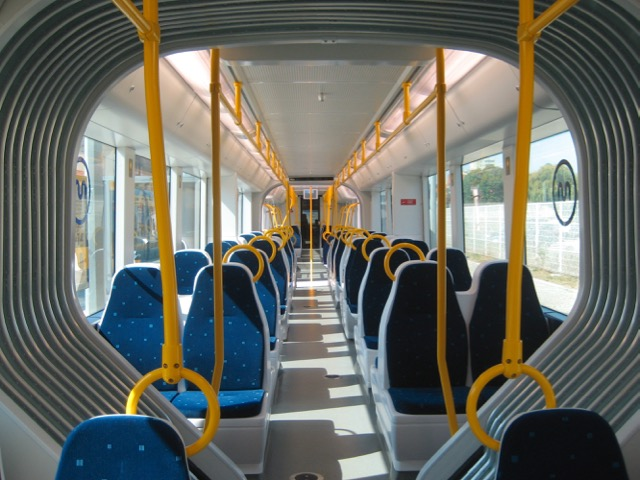
On board a Porto Metro tram

The Metro uses 72 modern Eurotram low-floor, articulated trams. Flexity Swift LRVs are used on line B, Bx and line C since 2008, and can reach 100 km/h (62.1 mph). They also have more seats, and can, in common with most modern light rail systems, recover 30% of the total of consumed energy during braking. The LRVs from CRRC Tangshan, dubbed CRRC Tram or CT, are the latest to be introduced on the network, running since 2023 on line C and E.

The majority of services run with two LRVs coupled together. The Eurotram consists of four main compartments, two in each carriage linked by short corridors, and also features an articulation between the two carriages. They have a capacity of 80 seated and 134 standing passengers. The Flexity Swift consists of three components linked by articulations, with a capacity of 100 seated and 148 standing passengers. The CT consists of four articulated components, having a capacity of 244 passengers, 64 of which are seated.

== Tickets ==
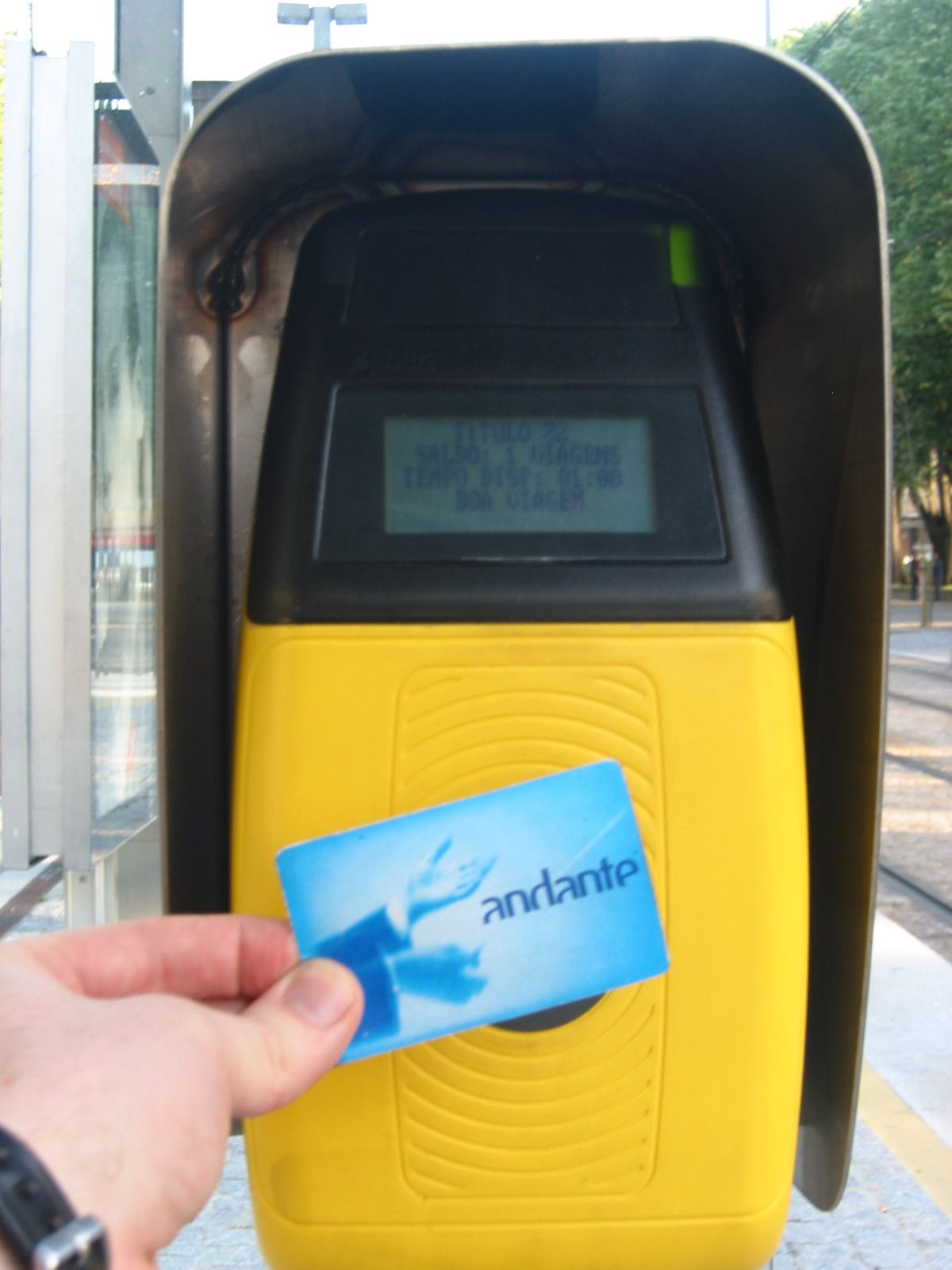
An Andante ticket being validated

The system uses the "Andante" ticketing system, used for public transport in the Porto Metropolitan Area. Under this system, a ticket holder can use multiple modes of transportation by various providers within a certain time period. Ticket prices and single ticket duration can vary depending on the number of zones that the ticket includes. The Andante system divides the Porto metropolitan area into fare zones, each representing a geographic area. The number of zones required is determined by the traveler's starting zone. A Z2 ticket allows the traveler go to all adjacent zones. A Z3 ticket lets the traveler go to all adjacent zones and to all zones adjacent to those.

Various ticketing options exist to use the Porto Metro. Paper tickets called Blue Andante (Andante azul) can be bought and recharged in machines in stations. These can be charged with single trips or 24 hour tickets. Monthly passes called Silver Andante (Andante prateado) can be purchased in Lojas Andante (Andante Shops) and topped up at Multibanco ATM terminals. They are personalized PVC cards with the name and picture of the holder. They are free for students between the ages of 4 and 18 and discounts exist for families, seniors, veterans and lower income households. Other ticketing options under the Andante system include Andante Tour, a 24 or 78 hour ticket for tourists, the Anda App, an app available for Android and contactless card payments on some readers. Children under 4 years old do not require a ticket if they are accompanied by an adult.

The Porto Metro operates on a proof-of-payment system. Tickets must be validated before travel by scanning them in front of the yellow machines located in stations. Instead, groups of fare inspectors randomly check tickets with hand-held scanners. As of October 2024, the penalty for travelling without a validated ticket is €95.

== Network ==
Metro do Porto
Line		Length	Stations	Opened	Equipment
Porto Metro	Estádio do Dragão – Senhor de Matosinhos	15.6 km (9.7 mi)	23	7 December 2002	Bombardier Flexity Outlook (Eurotram)
Porto Metro	Estádio do Dragão – Póvoa de Varzim	33.6 km (20.9 mi)	36	13 March 2005	Bombardier Flexity Swift
Porto Metro	Campanhã – ISMAI	19.6 km (12.2 mi)	24	30 July 2005	CRRC Tram (MP 200 series)
Porto Metro	Hospital São João – Vila d'Este	9.2 km (5.7 mi)	19	18 September 2005	Bombardier Flexity Outlook (Eurotram)
Porto Metro	Trindade – Aeroporto	13.1 km (8.1 mi)	21	27 May 2006	CRRC Tram (MP 200 series) and Bombardier Flexity Outlook (Eurotram)
Porto Metro	Fânzeres – Senhora da Hora	17.4 km (10.8 mi)	24	2 January 2011	Bombardier Flexity Outlook (Eurotram)
Porto Metro	Casa da Música – São Bento	2.7 km (1.7 mi)	4	To open by early 2027	Bombardier Flexity Outlook (Eurotram)
Porto Metro	Casa da Música – Santo Ovídio	6.3 km (3.9 mi)	8	To open by 2028	CRRC Tram (Updated unnamed model)
Metrobus
	Casa da Música – Império	3.7 km (2.3 mi)	7	28 February 2026	Hydrogen cell bus
	Casa da Música – Anémona	6.0 km (3.7 mi)	9	August 2026	Hydrogen cell bus

=== Line A – Senhor de Matosinhos – Estádio do Dragão ===
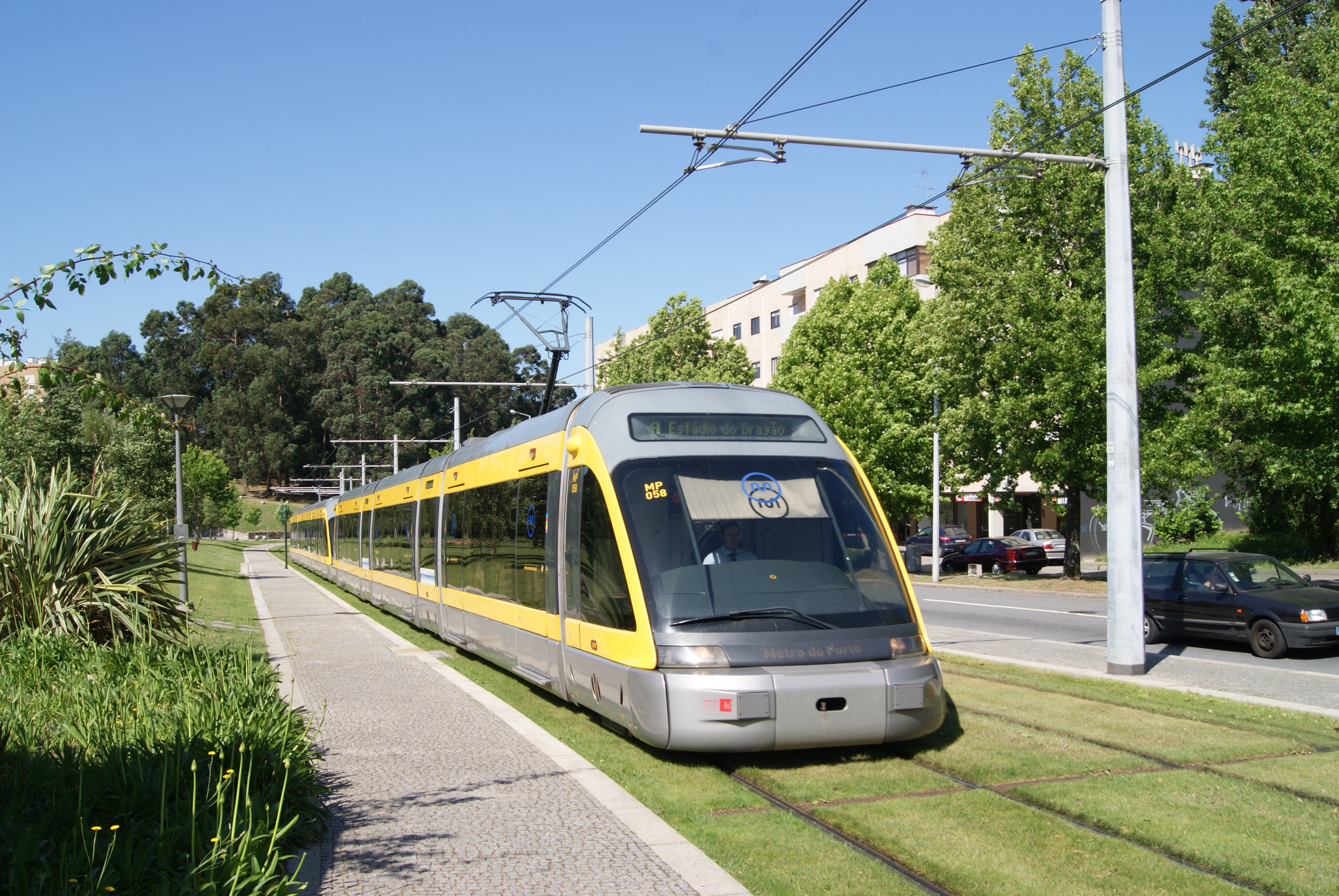
Grassy median of Line A

Line A or the Blue Line is the earliest of the five Porto Metro lines and the second busiest line as of 2023, transporting 12 million passengers. It runs between Senhor de Matosinhos and Estádio do Dragão stations, with 21 intermediate stations. Services run every 12 to 15 minutes with an end to end travel time of approximately 40 minutes.

Between Trindade and Senhora da Hora stations, the line uses the inner part of the route of the old Porto to Póvoa de Varzim railway line. Between Trindade and Estádio do Dragão stations it uses a new tunneled alignment, whilst between Senhora da Hora and Senhor de Matosinhos stations it mostly uses a new surface alignment, albeit with short sections coinciding with the route of the Matosinhos branch railway. Flexity Outlook Eurotrams number 001–072 service the line.

=== Line B/Bx – Póvoa de Varzim – Estádio do Dragão ===
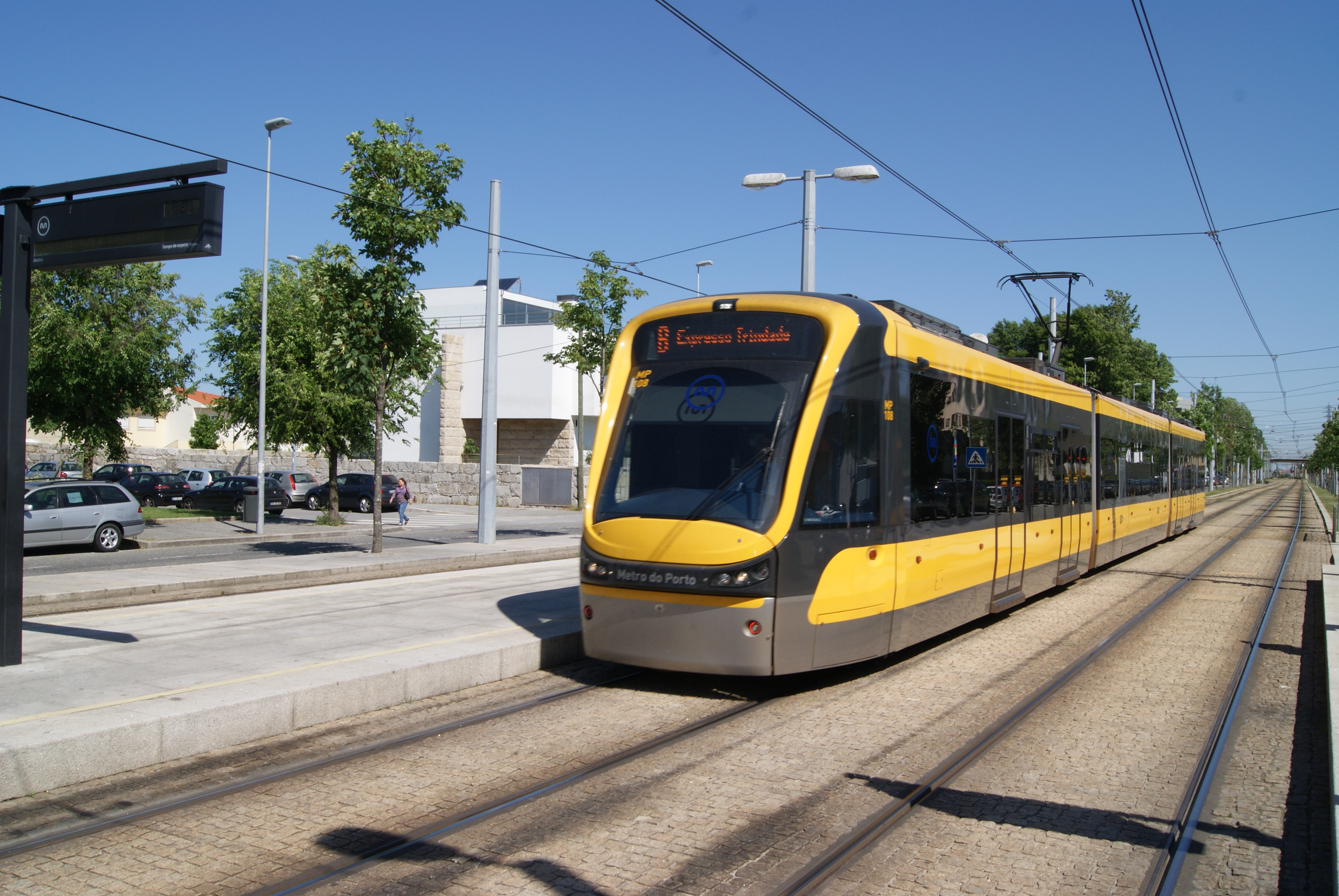
Bombardier Flexity Swift on Line B

Line B or the Red Line runs between Póvoa de Varzim and Estádio do Dragão stations, has 34 intermediate stations and is the longest line of the system. Because of its length, the line provides two types of services: B and Bx. The line reuses, for almost its entire length, the route of the old Porto to Póvoa de Varzim railway line.

The regular B service stops at all stations, whilst the express Bx service stops only at principal stations between Póvoa de Varzim and Senhora da Hora and at all station between Senhora da Hora and Estádio do Dragão. On weekdays during the day, each service provide two trams per hour in each directions. During weekends and in the evenings only the B service runs twice or thrice per hour in each directions. The regular service takes just over an hour between Póvoa de Varzim and Estádio do Dragão, while the express service saves approximate 10 minutes.

Although no extensions are planned, consideration was given to use the abandoned Famalicão branch of the old Póvoa Line, converted to a cycle path after closure, to reach Mourões and Barreiros, near Avenida 25 de Abril.

=== Line C – ISMAI – Campanhã ===
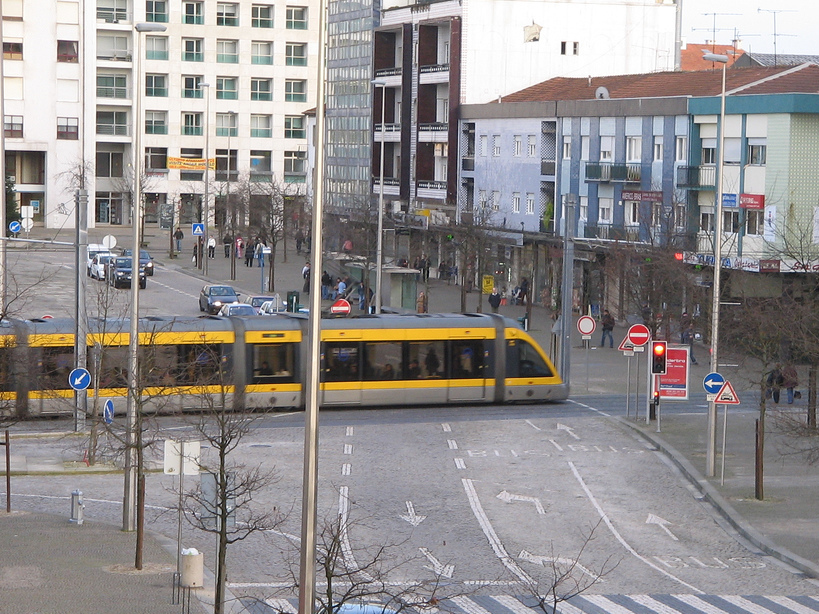
Line C near the Fórum Maia station

Line C or the Green Line runs between ISMAI and Campanhã stations, with 22 intermediate stations. The line has a basic frequency of four trams per hour, but some trams on the line terminate at Fórum da Maia. Travel time between ISMAI and Campanhã stations is just over 40 minutes.

The line reuses part of the route of the old Porto to Guimarães railway line, albeit with a significant section of new alignment through the city of Maia. Line C was originally projected to service the city of Trofa, previously served by this railway line. While, this project was never pursued, the Porto Metro provides a bus link between the ISMAI and Trofa.

=== Line D – Vila d'Este – Hospital São João ===
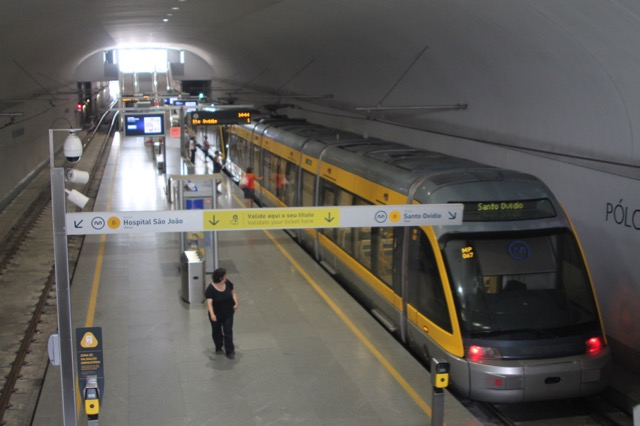
Eurotram at Pólo Universitário station

Line D or the Yellow Line runs between Vila d'Este and Hospital São João stations, with 17 intermediate stations and a very visible crossing of the River Douro on the upper level of the iconic Dom Luís I bridge. As of 2023, it was the busiest line of the Porto Metro, transporting a total of 30 million passengers across 106,500 train trips throughout the year.

Line D runs on an entirely new alignment, partly on the surface and partly underground, separate from all the other lines of the Porto Metro. It connects with lines A, B, C, E and F at Trindade station. Between Hospital São João and Santo Ovídio stations the service runs every 5 to 6 minutes during workdays, or every 10 minutes on weekends and evenings. Half of the trams have a southern terminus at Santo Ovídio, thus frequency is halves in the rest of the line until Vila d'Este. The travel time for the whole line is just over 30 minutes.

=== Line E – Aeroporto – Trindade (– Estádio do Dragão) ===
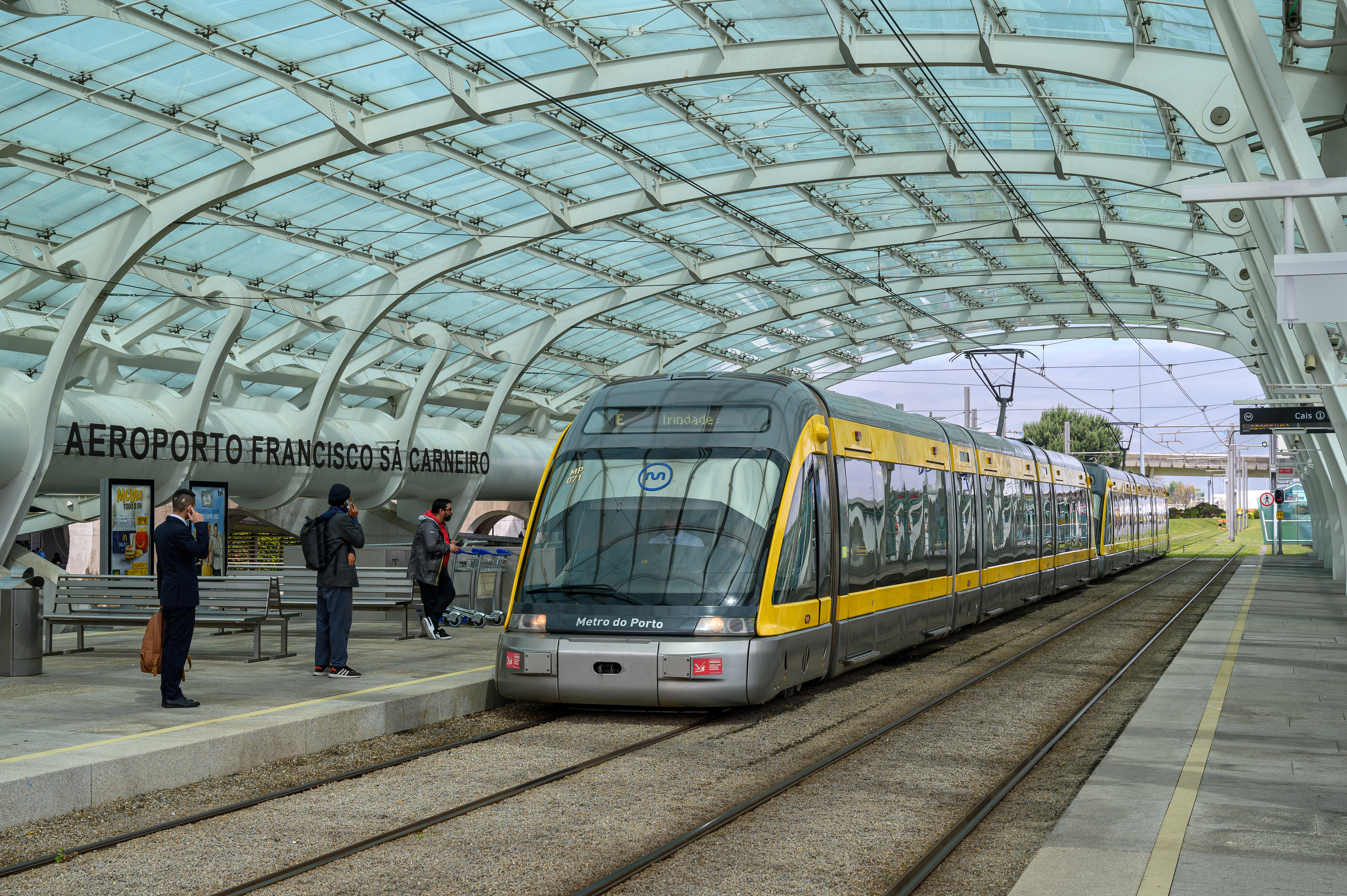
Tram at the Aeroporto station

Line E or the Violet Line runs between Aeroporto and Trindade stations, with 13 intermediate stations. Trams run as far as Trindade every 15 minutes, with a journey time of around 30 minutes. Depending on day and time, between one and three trams an hour continue beyond Trindade to Estádio do Dragão, serving a further four intermediate stations and taking about 10 more minutes.

Line E was specifically built to serve Porto Airport, and Aeroporto station is directly accessible from the terminal building. The station is at the end of a short branch off line B of the Metro, which it joins at Verdes station, sharing tracks variously with lines A, B, C and F for the rest of its route.

=== Line F – Fânzeres – Senhora da Hora (– Senhor de Matosinhos) ===
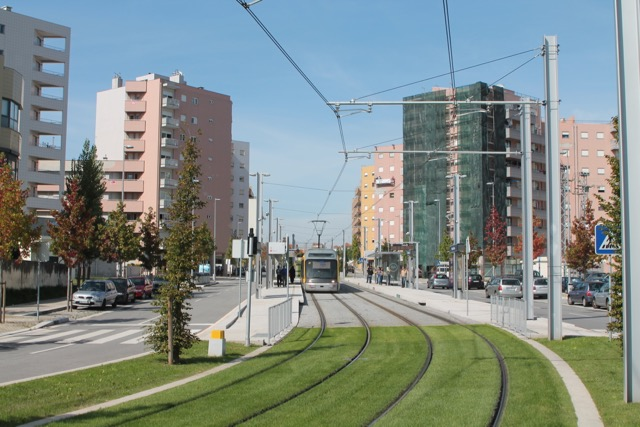
Venda Nova station

Line F or the Orange Line runs between Fânzeres and Senhora da Hora stations, stopping at 22 additional stations and taking approximately 40 minutes. Trams depart as frequently as every 12 minutes during weekdays, and as little as every 30 minutes during the evenings.

It is expected that the line will be extended from Senhora da Hora to Senhor de Matosinhos, which is the current teminus of Line A. This extension is shown on new official network maps of the Porto Metro, but as of February 2025 it has not been incorporated into the official timetable.

Besides the shared segment between Senhora da Hora and Estádio do Dragão, Line F runs mainly above ground. It is the only service operating in the municipality of Gondomar, and it transported 9 million people in 2024.

=== Line 1 MetroBus – Casa da Música – Império ===
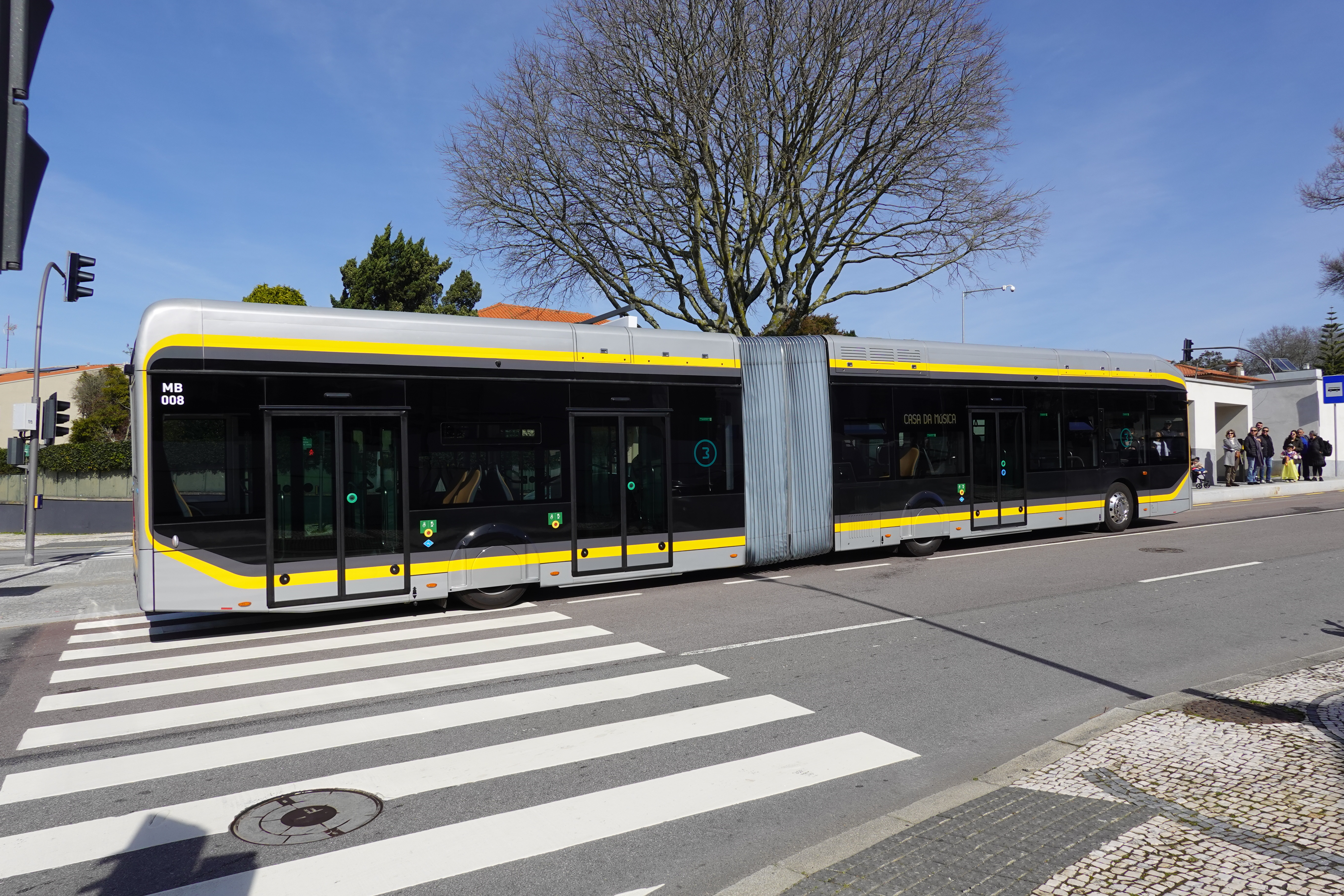
Porto Metro's MetroBus

Line 1 is a Bus rapid transit, called MetroBus, which opened for service on 28 February 2026, between Casa da Música and Império Square, run by hydrogen cell buses, that is managed by Porto Metro. It stops at seven stations, with MetroBus departures with a frequency of 10 minutes during weekdays and rush hours, and 15 minutes during the weekend.

== Future expansion ==
- Metrobus line 2: A Bus rapid transit line is expected to open for service by August 2026, between Casa da Música and Anémona, in Matosinhos, also run by hydrogen cell buses.
- Line G (Pink line): A new 2.7km, 4 station fully underground line which connects Casa da Música to São Bento through Cordoaria. The construction started in 2020 and Porto Metro expects it to be concluded by early 2027.
- Line H (Ruby line): A new 6.74km, 8 station line that will connect Casa da Música station in Porto with Santo Ovídio station in Vila Nova de Gaia. Construction started in May 2024 with the line planned to enter service, partially, by 2028.

== See also ==
- Trams in Porto
- Sociedade de Transportes Colectivos do Porto (STCP)
- Lisbon Metro
- List of tram and light rail transit systems
