= Senhor de Matosinhos station =

Light rail station in Matosinhos, Portugal

Senhor de Matosinhos
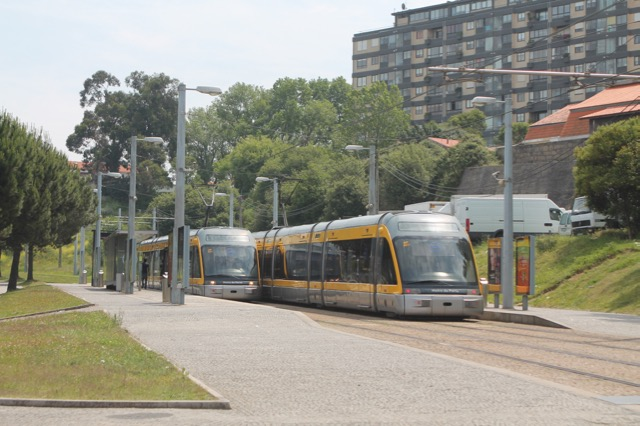
- Track and platforms

General information
- Location: Matosinhos; Portugal
- Coordinates: 41°11′17.50″N 8°41′06.50″W
- System: Porto Metro station
- Platforms: 2 side platforms
- Tracks: 2

Construction
- Structure type: At grade
- Accessible: Yes

History
- Opened: 7 December 2002

Services
Preceding station	Porto Metro	Following station
Terminus	Line A	Mercado towards Estádio do Dragão
Location

Senhor de Matosinhos is a light rail station on the Porto Metro system in the municipality of Matosinhos, Portugal. The station is the terminus of line A of the Metro, which provides a direct connection to the centre of the city of Porto. It was opened in 2002.

While much of the first stage of the Porto Metro was built using the trackbed of the network of 1,000 mm (3 ft 3 3/8 in) gauge railways that served the area to the north of Porto, including a line to Matosinhos, the Senhor de Matosinhos station is on a new alignment created for the Metro. The new station was on the first section of the Porto Metro to open and was inaugurated on 7 December 2002, with commercial services starting on 1 January 2003.

Senhor de Matosinhos is the terminus of line A, and the next station after departure is Mercado. The platforms are at street level, with two through tracks served by two side platforms accessible directly from the street. Trains arrive on one platform, and run past the station to reverse before departing from the other platform. There are four or five trains per hour in each direction.
