= Fânzeres station =

Light rail station on the Porto Metro in Porto, Portugal

Fânzeres
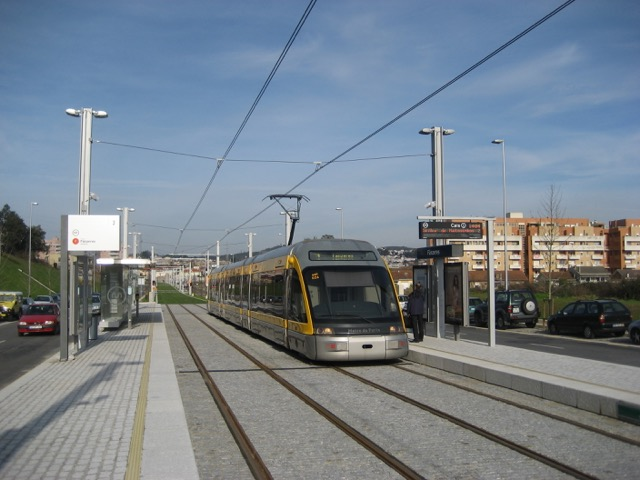

General information
- Location: Fânzeres; Gondomar; Portugal
- Coordinates: 41°10′16.70″N 8°32′34″W
- System: Porto Metro station
- Platforms: 2 side platforms
- Tracks: 2

Construction
- Structure type: At Grade
- Accessible: Yes

History
- Opened: 2 January 2011

Services
Preceding station	Porto Metro	Following station
Venda Nova towards Senhora da Hora	Line F	Terminus
Location

Fânzeres is a light rail station that is the terminus of line F of the Porto Metro system in Portugal. It is located in the centre of Av. Prof. Dr. Anibal Cavaco Silva in the town of Fânzeres and municipality of Gondomar. It was opened, along with line F, on 2 January 2011.

The platforms at Fânzeres are at street level, with two through tracks served by two side platforms accessible directly from the street. There are turnback sidings situated beyond the platforms that allow trams to arrive on one platform and depart from the other platform. The next station after departure is Venda Nova. There are four or five trains per hour in each direction on weekdays, reducing to two on Sundays.

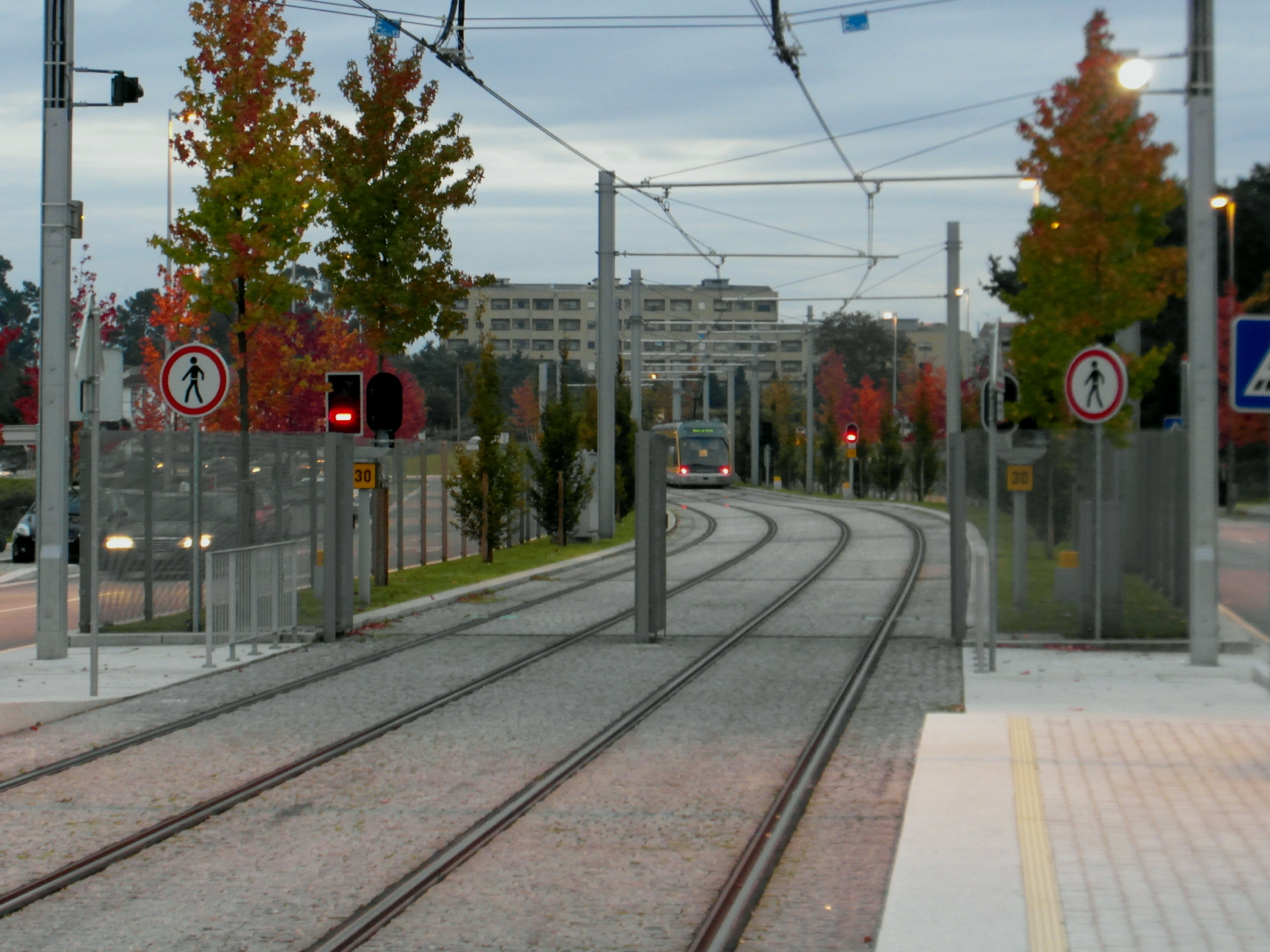
Siding beyond the platforms, with terminating tram

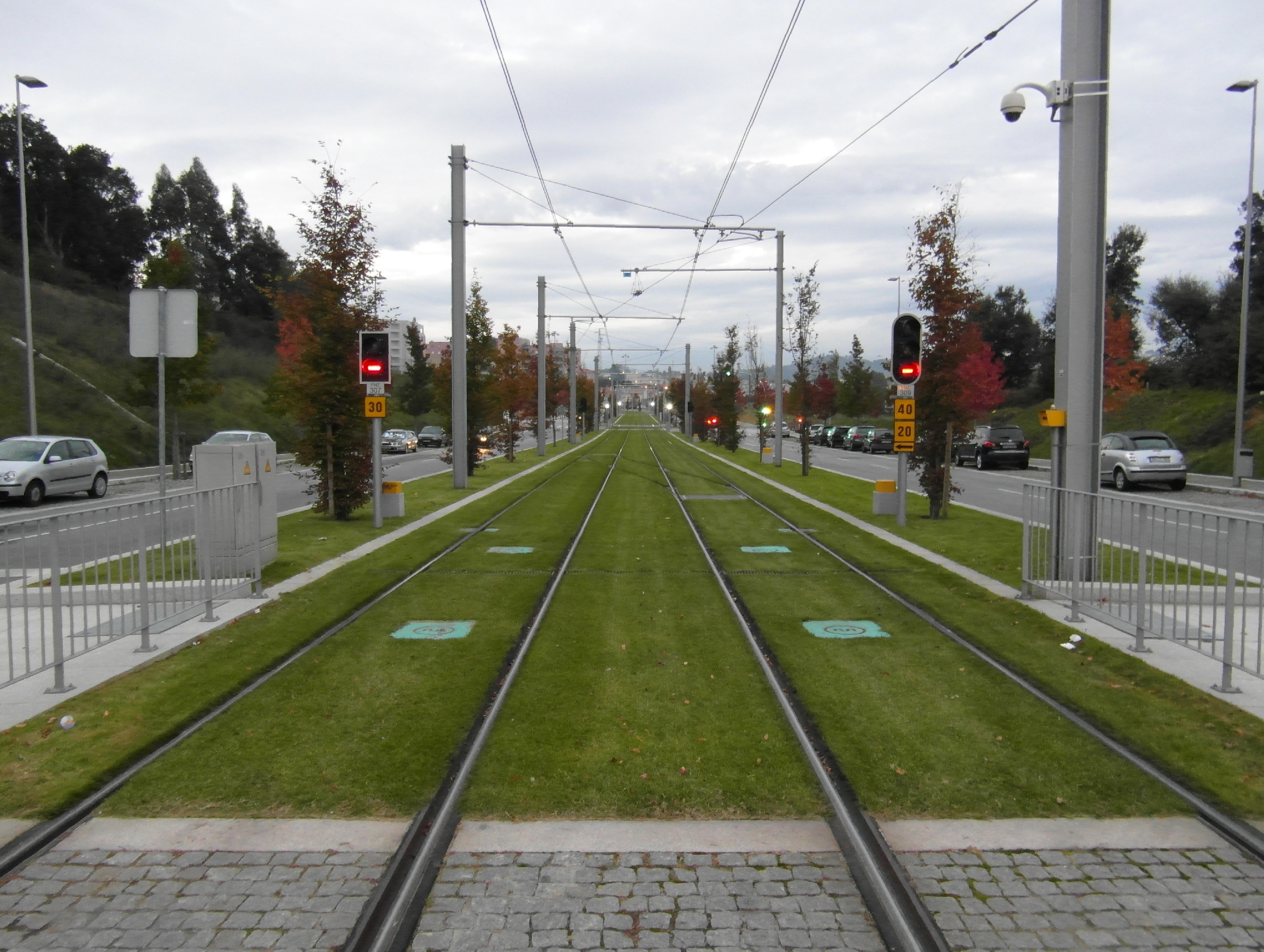
Track north of the platforms, in the direction of Porto

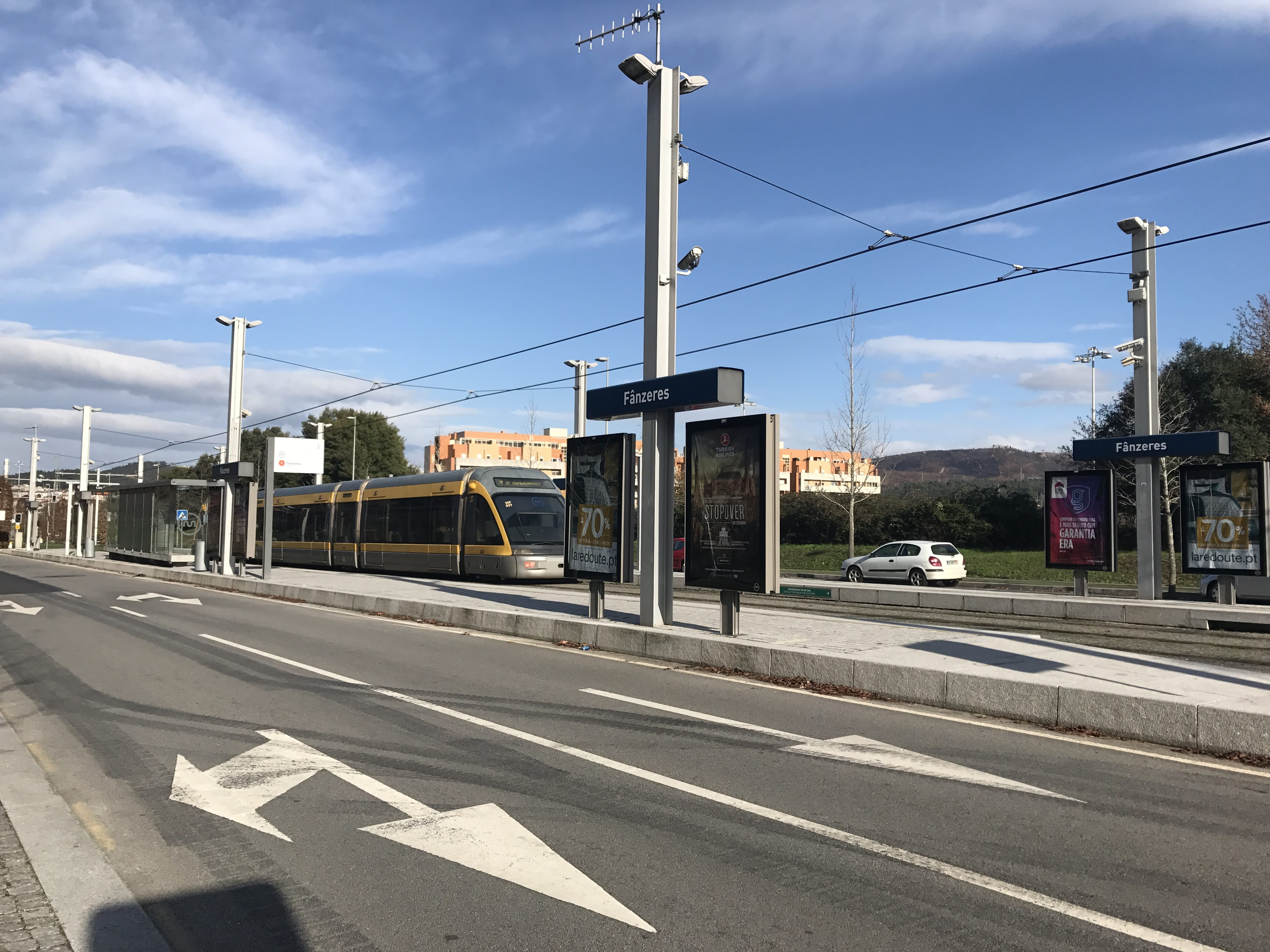
The station seen from the adjoining street
