= 2027 in rail transport =

This article lists events related to rail transport that are currently scheduled to occur in 2027. Please be aware that the actual dates on which these events occur may differ substantially from what is shown here.

== Events ==
=== January ===
- 1 January
  - (Bangladesh) – MRT Line 6 of the Dhaka Metro Rail extends to Kamalapur from Motijheel.
- (Russia) – Chelyabinsk Metrotram is scheduled to open between Komsomolskaya Ploshchad and Prospekt Pobedy.
- (Turkey) – Başkentray extends to Yenikent from Sincan.
- 17 January
  - (Poland) – The M2 line of the Warsaw Metro is extended to Karolin from Bemowo
  - (Poland) – Warszawa Ulrychów railway station is scheduled to open
  - (Poland) – The extensive reconstruction of Warszawa Wschodnia railway station is scheduled to begin
- (India) – Range Hills station opens as an infill station on the Pune Metro Purple Line

=== February ===
- (Malaysia) – Johor Bahru–Singapore Rapid Transit System opens between Bukit Chagar RTS station in Johor Bahru and Woodlands North MRT station in Singapore.
- (France) 28 February – Line E of the Paris RER extends to Mantes-la-Jolie from Nanterre–La Folie.

=== March ===
- (Spain) 1 March – FGC takes over operation of lines RL3 and RL4 of the Lleida commuter railway service with new Stadler FLIRT trainsets.
- (Germany) 21 March – Line 1 of the Bremen Tramway Network extends to Brüsseler Straße from Roland-Center.
- (France) 28 March – CDG Express is scheduled to open between Gare de l'Est and Aéroport Charles de Gaulle 2 TGV.
- (Egypt) – Alexandria Metro opens between Abu Qir and Misr station.
- (France) – Oxygène trainsets are due to enter service in Intercités lines operated by SNCF Voyageurs.
- (India) – Line 1 of the Patna Metro is scheduled to open between Malahi Pakri and New ISBT.
- (United States) – Rockford Intercity Passenger Rail of the Metra commuter rail network opens from Chicago to Rockford.
- (United States) – OC Streetcar opens between the Santa Ana Regional Transportation Center and the Harbor Transit Center.
- (India) – The Pink Line of the Pune Metro opens from Balewadi High Street to Baner Pashan Link Road and stations at Bhosalenagar - RBI, and Shivaji Nagar.
- (Portugal) – Line G of the Porto Metro opens between Casa da Música and São Bento.
- (Turkey) – Gebze Metro opens between Darıca and Gebze.

=== April ===
- (Australia) – Western Sydney Airport Line of the Sydney Metro is scheduled to open between St Marys and Bradfield.

=== June ===
- (United States) 12 June – Metro Green Line Extension of the Minneapolis Metro Light Rail opens from Target Field to Southwest.
- (Italy) (Germany) 13 June – Trenitalia launches passenger trains from Milan and Rome to Munich.
- (India) – Blue Line of the Namma Metro extends to KIAL Terminals from Krishnarajapura.

=== August ===
- (India) 15 August – Mumbai–Ahmedabad High Speed Rail is scheduled to open between Bilimora and Surat.
- (Mexico) 31 August – Line 5 of the Monterrey Metrorrey is scheduled to open between Hospital Gene and La Estanzuela.

=== September ===
- (France) – Line B of the Toulouse metro is scheduled to extend to Labège Madron from Ramonville.

=== October ===
- (France) – Line 15 of the Paris Metro opens between Pont de Sèvres and Noisy - Champs.
- (United States) – Metro-North Railroad: Some New Canaan Line, Danbury Line, Waterbury Line and New Haven Line services are to be diverted to New York Penn Station instead of Grand Central, as part of the Penn Station Access.

=== November ===
- (South Korea) – In Seoul, Dongbuk Line is scheduled to open between Wangsimni and Sanggye.

=== December ===
- 12 December
  - (France) – Nancy-Contrexéville railway reopens.
  - (Italy) (Germany) – Trenitalia launches passenger trains from Naples to Munich.
  - (Netherlands) (Belgium) (France) – Arriva Personenvervoer Nederland begins a conventional speed train service between Den Haag and Paris, and between Groningen and Paris.
  - (Norway) – Flytoget service is discontinued.
- (Azerbaijan) – Baku suburban railway will be extended to Baku International Airport.
- (India) – Blue Line of the Namma Metro opens between Central Silk Board and Krishnarajapura.
- (India) – Surat Metro is scheduled to open between Sartha and Dream City.
- (South Korea) – Dongtan Metro: Line 1 is scheduled to open between Soyosan and Sinchang; Line 2 is scheduled to open between Humen and Dongtan.
- (Sweden) – Blue Line of the Stockholm Metro extends to Barkarby from Akalla.

=== Unknown date ===
- (Albania) – Albanian railways will modernise Durrës–Tirana railway as well as construct a railway connection to Tirana International Airport.
- (Egypt) – West Nile Line of the Cairo Monorail opens between New October and Alexandria Desert Road.
- (Australia) – Inland Railway is scheduled to open between Port Augusta and Brisbane.
- (Austria) – Bahnstrecke Wiener Neustadt–Sopron is electrified between Wiener Neustadt and Schattendorf and doubbled between Wiener Neustadt and Katzelsdorf, as well as within Loipersbach-Schattendorf station.
- (Azerbaijan) – Green Line of the Baku Metro will be completely separated from Red Line when the tunnel between Jafar Jabbarly and Nizami will be modernised.
- (Azerbaijan) – Green Line of the Baku Metro extends to Y-4B (Darnagul Depot) from Darnagul.
- (Azerbaijan) – A total of 20 new and reconstructed passenger railroad stations are planned on the Absheron Peninsula by the end of 2027.
- – Aras Corridor, rail bridge connecting Azerbaijan with its region Nakhchivan via Iran.
- (Belgium) – Line 5 of the Charleroi Tramway Network is scheduled to open between Neuville and Les Viviers.
- (Belgium) – Line 5 of the Charleroi Tramway Network branches off to Châtelet from Waterloo.
- (Brazil) – Suburban rail line opens in Arapiraca.
- (Brazil) – Line 2 of the São Paulo Metro is scheduled to open between Vila Prudente and Vila Formosa.
- (Brazil) – Line 6 of the São Paulo Metro is scheduled to open between Bandeirantes and Sao Carlos.
- (Canada) – Ottawa O-Train: Line 1 extends to Algonquin from Tunney's Pasture; Line 3 is scheduled to open between Trim and Moodie.
- (Canada) – Airport Branch of the Montreal REM is scheduled to open between Airport and Bois-Franc station.
- (Canada) – Millennium Line of the SkyTrain extends to Arbutus from VCC–Clark.
- (China) – Line 9 of the Changchun Rail Transit is scheduled to open between Wukaihe Dajie and Jiutai South Railway Station.
- (China) – Line S11 of the Chengdu Metro is scheduled to open between Deyang North and Weijianian.
- (China) – Jiangtiao Line of the Chongqing Rail Transit extends to Shengquansi from Dingshan.
- (China) – Line 27 of the Chongqing Rail Transit is scheduled to open from Huimin from Bishan.
- (China) – Line 2 of the Dongguan Rail Transit extends to Jiaoyiwan from Humen Railway Statiom.
- (China) – Line 2 of the Ürümqi Metro is scheduled to open between Yan'an Road and Huashan Street.
- (Colombia) – RegioTram of Bogotá is scheduled to open between Facatativá and Fontibón.
- (Czech Republic) – Line 5 of the Prague tramway network extends from Olšanská to Habrová and a new terminus at Jarov; new lines 28 and 29 open.
- (Egypt) – Ain Sokhna To Marsa Matrouh High Speed Railway is scheduled to open between Ain Sokhna and Marsa Matrouh.
- (Estonia) – Tapa-Narva Line of the Estonian Railways is electrified between Tapa and Narva.
- (France) – Line 18 of the Paris Metro opens between Massy-Palaiseau and Christ de Saclay.
- (France) – Line 18 of the Paris Metro is scheduled to open between Massy–Palaiseau and Aéroport d'Orly.
- (France) – Line F of the Strasbourg Tramway Network extends to Place D'Islande from Elsau.
- (Germany) – Line U5 of the Frankfurt U-Bahn extends to Europaviertel from Frankfurt Hauptbanhhopf.
- (Germany) – Line U3 of the Nuremberg U-Bahn extends to Gebersdorf from Großreuth bei Schweinau.
- (Germany) – Line U6 of the Munich U-Bahn extends to Martinsried from Klinikum Großhadern.
- (Germany) – Nox sets night train services.
- (Germany) – Rastatt Tunnel is scheduled to open.
- (India) – Pink Line of the Namma Metro is scheduled to open between Kalena Agrahara and Tavarekere.
- (Italy) – Line 1 of the Milan Metro extends to Monza from Sesto Primo Maggio.
- (Italy) – Line 1 of the Naples Metro extends to Naples Airport from Garibaldi.
- (Italy) (Germany) – Trenitalia launches passenger trains from Rome and Milan to Munich.
- (Japan) – Tokyo-Tohoku night train launched.
- (Latvia) – Pasažieru vilciens resumes passenger services between Riga and Bolderāja.
- – Luxembourg-Bettembourg Line of the CFL Network is scheduled to open between Luxembourg and Bettembourg.
- – Line T1 of the Luxembourg Tramway Network extends to Nei Hollerich and Hollerich from HOA.
- (Mexico) – The Felipe Ángeles extends to Pachuca from AIFA–Clara Krause.
- (Italy) – Line 1 of the Naples Metro extends to Capodichino from Centro Direzionale.
- (Netherlands) (Spain) – European Sleeper introduces new night train service between Amsterdam and Barcelona.
- (Philippines) – Line 7 of the Manila MRT is scheduled to open between North EDSA and Sacred Heart.
- (Portugal) – Line H of the Porto Metro is scheduled to open between Casa da Música and Santo Ovídio.
- (Russia) – Krasnoyarsk Metro is scheduled to open between Vysotnaya and Leninskaya.
- (Russia) – New line for trams in Moscow is scheduled to open between Ulitsa Akademika Koroleva and Ostankino.
- (Russia) – Avtozavodskaya Line of Nizhny Novgorod Metro is extended from Gorkovskaya to Sennaya.
- (Saudi Arabia) – al-Ula tram is scheduled to open.
- (Serbia) (Bulgaria) – Niš-Dimitrovgrad railway is modernised.
- – Jurong Region Line of the Singapore MRT is scheduled to open between Choa Chu Kang to Boon Lay and Tawas.
- (South Korea) – Chuncheon–Sokcho Line of the Korail Network is upgraded to 250 km/h (160 mph) between Chuncheon and Sokcho.
- (South Korea) – Donghae Line of the Korail Network is upgraded to 250 km/h (160 mph) between Busanjin and BEXCO.
- (South Korea) – Honam Line of the Korail Network is upgraded to 250 km/h (160 mph) between Daejeon and Mokpo.
- (South Korea) – Gyeongbu High Speed Railway of the Korail Network is upgraded to 400 km/h (250 mph) between Seoul and Busan.
- (South Korea) – Gyeonggang Line of the Korail Network is upgraded to 250 km/h (160 mph) between Seoul and Busan.
- (South Korea) – Suseo–Gwangju High Speed Branch of the Korail Network is scheduled to open between Suseo and Gwangju.
- (South Korea) – Line 7 of the Seoul Subway extends to Cheongna Int'l Business Complex from Seongnam.
- (Spain) – Algeciras-Bobadilla Junction Line of the Renfe Network is electrified between Algeciras and Bobadilla Junction.
- (Spain) – Barcelona Metro: Line 9 and Line 10 extend to Guinardó - Hospital de Sant Pau from La Sagrera.
- (Spain) – FGC takes over operation of lines RL3 and RL4 of the Lleida commuter railway service with new Stadler FLIRT trainsets.
- (Spain) – R-Aeroport, a new FGC-operated airport rail link service enters operation between Sant Andreu and Barcelona Airport.
- (Spain) – Basque Y High Speed Railway is scheduled to open between Vitoria and Hendaye.
- (Spain) – Zaragoza–Pamplona High Speed Railway is scheduled to open between Castejon and Pamplona.
- (Spain) – Line 5 of the Bilbao Metro is scheduled to open between Sarratu and Galdakao.
- (Taiwan) – Wanda–Shulin Line of the Taipei Metro is scheduled to open between Chiang Kai-shek Memorial Hall and Juguang.
- (Thailand) – Purple Line of the Bangkok MRT extends to Rat Burana from Tao Poon.
- (Turkey) – Istanbul Metro M4 extends to Kaynarca Merkez from Sabiha Gokcen Airport.
- (Turkey) – M10 of Istanbul Metro extension from Fevzi Çakmak to Pendik Merkez.
- (Turkey) – Istanbul Metro M14 opens between Altunizade and Bosna Bulvarı.
- (Turkey) – M2 line of the İzmir Metro opens between Üçyol and Fuar İzmir.
- (Turkey) – KonyaRay is scheduled to open between Konya railway station and 2. Sanayi.
- (Turkey) – Kayseri-Ankara High-Speed railway is scheduled to open.
- (United Kingdom) – Lumo is scheduled to open service between London and Manchester.
- (United States) – Amtrak New Orleans–Baton Rouge Passenger Rail is scheduled to open between New Orleans and Baton Rouge.
- (United States) – Amtrak Northeast Regional extends to New River Valley from Roanoke.
- (United States) – Amtrak Quad Cities is scheduled to open between Chicago and Moline.
- (United States) – Omaha Streetcar is scheduled to open between CHI Health Center and 42nd St.
- (United States) – Maryland Purple Line is scheduled to open between Bethesda and New Carrolton.
- (United States) – D Line of Los Angeles Metro Rail extends to Westwood/VA Hospital from Century City.
- (United States) – Coaster extends to Downtown San Diego from Santa Fe Depot.
- (United States) – S-Line streetcar is to be extended to Highland from Fairmont.
- (Vietnam) – A metro line opens in Phú Quốc.
- (India) – The Purple Line of the Pune Metro will extend from PCMC Bhavan to Bhakti Shakti.
- (Portugal) – Green Line of Lisbon Metro extends from Cais do Sodré to Rato, making it a circular route; Yellow line reroutes to Telheiras from Rato.
