= Khadki metro station =

Pune Metro's Purple Line metro station

Khadki

General information
- Location: Old Mumbai - Pune Highway, Khadki, Pune, Maharashtra 411003
- Coordinates: 18°34′11″N 73°50′17″E
- System: Pune Metro station
- Owner: Maharashtra Metro Rail Corporation Limited (Maha Metro)
- Operator: Pune Metro
- Line: Purple Line
- Platforms: Side platform Platform-1 → Swargate; Platform-2 → PCMC Bhavan
- Tracks: 2

Construction
- Structure type: Elevated, Double track
- Platform levels: 2
- Accessible: Yes

Other information
- Station code: KK

History
- Opened: 21 June 2025; 14 months ago
- Electrified: 25 kV 50 Hz AC overhead catenary

Services
Preceding station	Pune Metro	Following station
Bopodi towards PCMC Bhavan	Purple Line	Shivaji Nagar towards Swargate
Route map
Location

Khadki is an elevated metro station on the North-South corridor of the Purple Line of Pune Metro in Pune, India. The station was opened later on 21 June 2025 as an extension of Pune Metro Phase I. Since then, this line was operational between PCMC and Civil Court. On 29 September 2024, the launch of Pune Metro Phase I was completed and the Purple Line was fully operational from PCMC to Swargate.

== Station layout ==
G	Street level	Exit/Entrance
L1	Mezzanine	Fare control, station agent, Metro Card vending machines, crossover
L2	Side platform | Doors will open on the left
L2	Platform 1 Southbound	Towards → Swargate; Next Station: Shivaji Nagar
L2	Platform 2 Northbound	Towards ← PCMC Bhavan; Next Station: Bopodi
L2	Side platform | Doors will open on the left
L2

== See also ==
- Pune
- Maharashtra
- Rapid Transit in India
