= Bopodi metro station =

Pune Metro's Purple Line metro station

Bopodi
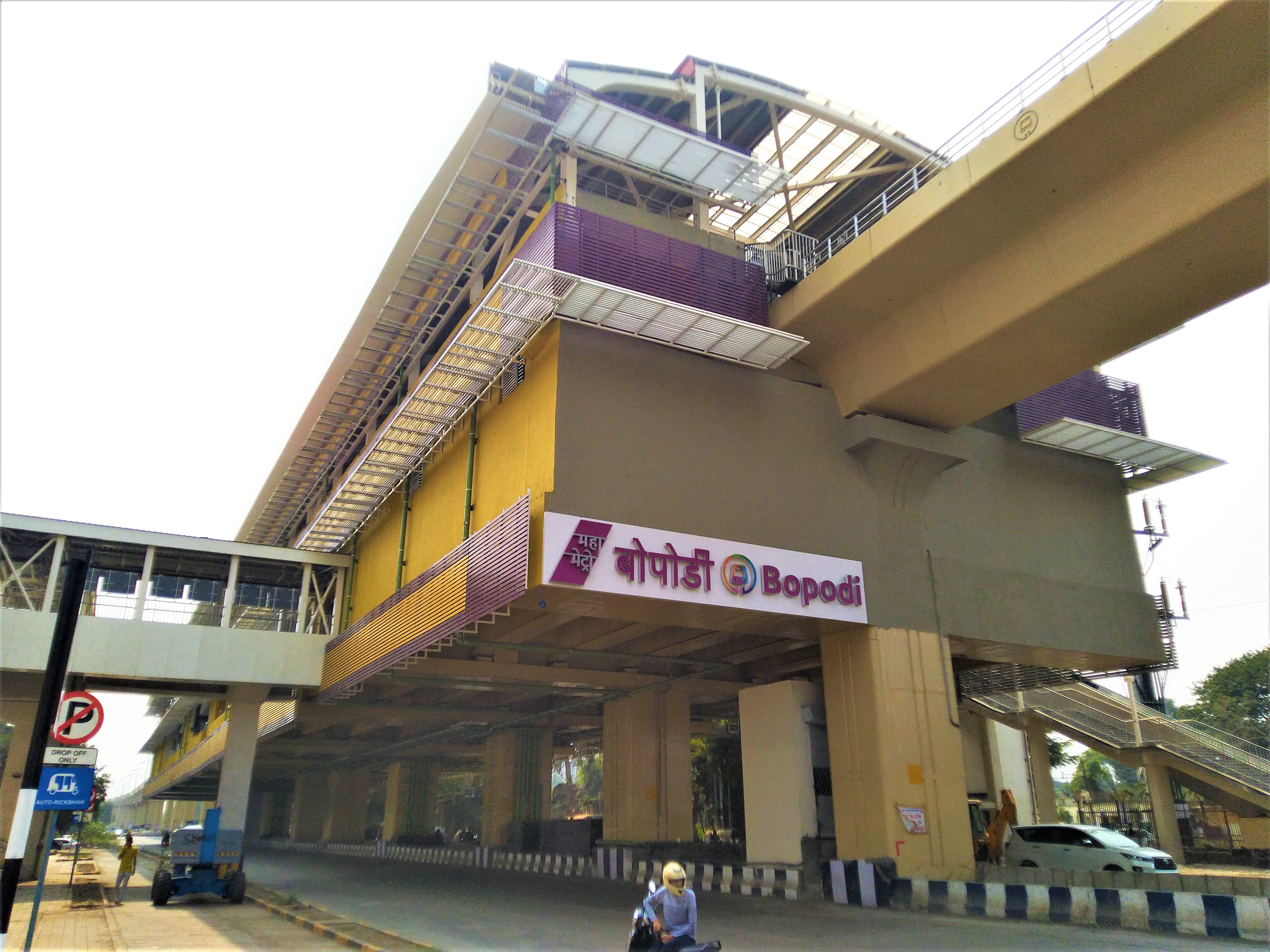

General information
- Location: Old Mumbai - Pune Hwy, Bopodi, Pune, Maharashtra 411003
- Coordinates: 18°34′11″N 73°50′17″E
- System: Pune Metro station
- Owner: Maharashtra Metro Rail Corporation Limited (MAHA-METRO)
- Operator: Pune Metro
- Line: Purple Line
- Platforms: Side platform Platform-1 → Swargate; Platform-2 → PCMC Bhavan
- Tracks: 2

Construction
- Structure type: Elevated, Double track
- Platform levels: 2
- Accessible: Yes

Other information
- Station code: BPI

History
- Opened: 1 August 2023; 3 years ago
- Electrified: 25 kV 50 Hz AC overhead catenary

Services
Preceding station	Pune Metro	Following station
Dapodi towards PCMC Bhavan	Purple Line	Khadki towards Swargate
Route map
Location

Bopodi is an elevated metro station on the North-South corridor of the Purple Line of Pune Metro in Pune, India. The station was opened on 1 August 2023 as an extension of Pune Metro Phase I. Since then, this line was operational between PCMC and Civil Court. On 29 September 2024, the launch of Pune Metro Phase I was completed and the Purple Line was fully operational from PCMC to Swargate.

== Station layout ==
G	Street level	Exit/Entrance
L1	Mezzanine	Fare control, station agent, Metro Card vending machines, crossover
L2	Side platform | Doors will open on the left
L2	Platform 1 Southbound	Towards → Swargate; Next Station: Khadki
L2	Platform 2 Northbound	Towards ← PCMC Bhavan; Next Station: Dapodi
L2	Side platform | Doors will open on the left
L2

== See also ==
- Pune
- Maharashtra
- Rapid Transit in India
