= Metrotram =

Metrotram may refer to:

- Berlin MetroTram, 24-hour tram lines in Berlin, Germany
- Metrotramvay, subway-surface tram lines in former Soviet countries
  - Chelyabinsk Metrotram, subway-surface system in Chelyabinsk, Russia
  - Krasnoyarsk Metrotram, subway-surface system in Krasnoyarsk, Russia
  - Kryvyi Rih Metrotram, subway-surface system in Kryvyi Rih, Ukraine
  - Volgograd Metrotram, subway-surface system in Volgograd, Russia
- Metrotranvía Mendoza, light rail line between Mendoza and Maipú, Argentina
- ATM Class 7000, hybrid vehicle for Turin, Italy
