= Kasba Peth metro station =

Pune Metro's Purple Line metro station

Kasba Peth
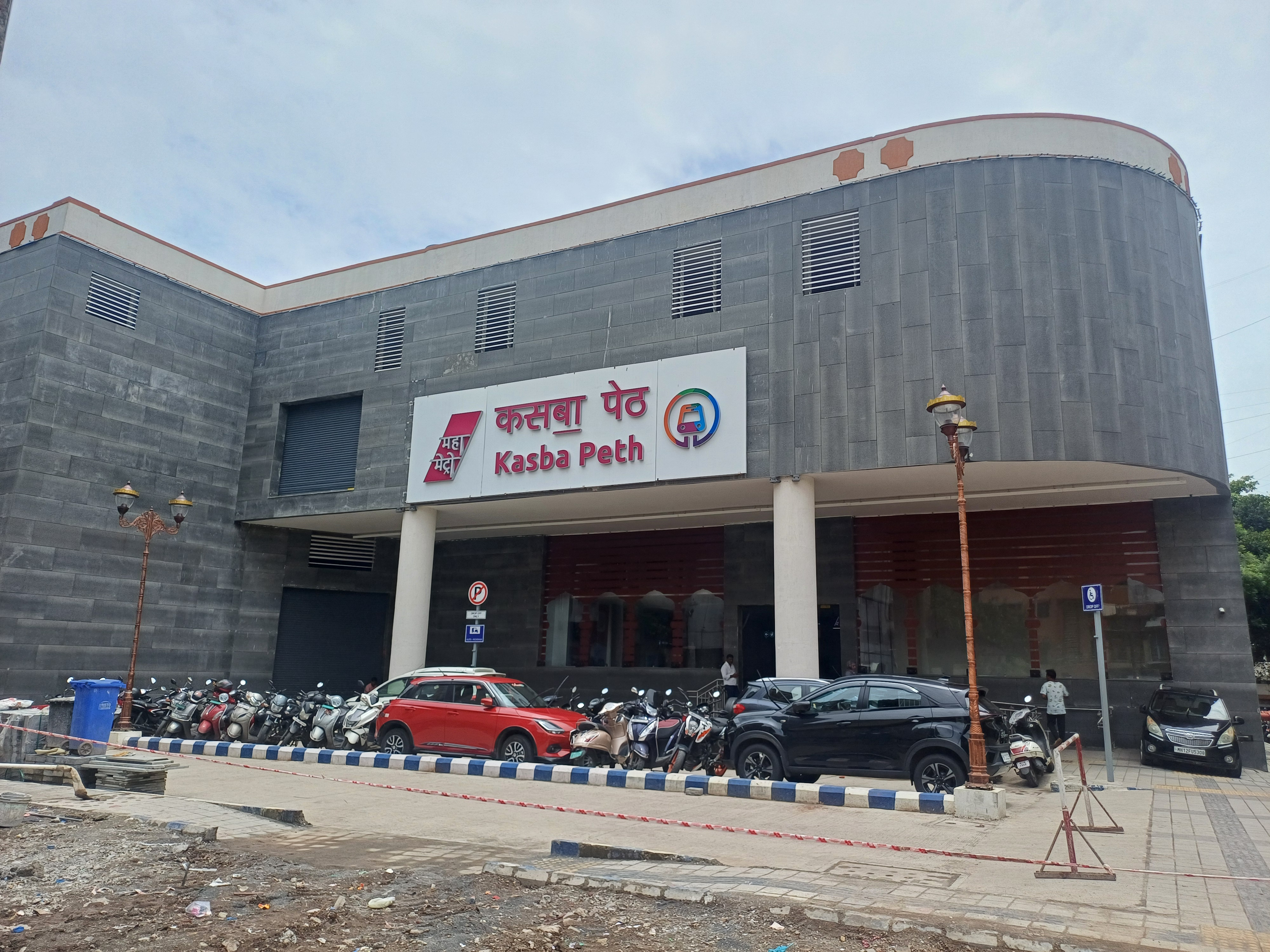

General information
- Location: Kasba Peth, Pune, Maharashtra 411011
- Coordinates: 18°31′16″N 73°51′34″E
- System: Pune Metro station
- Owner: Maharashtra Metro Rail Corporation Limited (Maha Metro)
- Operator: Pune Metro
- Line: Purple Line
- Platforms: Island platform Platform-1 → Swargate; Platform-2 → PCMC Bhavan
- Tracks: 2

Construction
- Structure type: Underground, Double track
- Platform levels: 2
- Accessible: Yes

Other information
- Station code: BPO

History
- Opened: 29 September 2024; 22 months ago
- Electrified: 25 kV 50 Hz AC overhead catenary

Services
Preceding station	Pune Metro	Following station
District Court Pune towards PCMC Bhavan	Purple Line	Mahatma Phule Mandai towards Swargate
Route map
Location

Kasba Peth is an underground southern terminal metro station on the north–south corridor of the Purple Line of Pune Metro in Pune, India. The station was opened on 29 September 2024 as the final extension of Pune Metro Phase I. During the planning phase, this facility was officially designated as Budhwar Peth metro station. However, it was renamed as Kasba Peth metro station due to its location in Kasba Peth.

The proposed location of the underground station was met with protests from the residents of Kasba Peth. They wanted the station to be shifted as it would displace the inhabitants and affect the historical structures in the area. Some also believed that there was no need for a station in Kasba Peth as the District Court and Mahatma Phule Mandai stations were nearby, further adding that it is mainly a residential area with little commercial activity. The people also considered voting boycott at the 2019 Indian general election as their voice was not being heard. After a year–long resistance by the localites, MahaMetro accepted their demand and the station was shifted to the land allocated for the Dadoji Konddev Primary School.

The tunneling work for the station began from Civil Court as well Swargate. Two tunnel boring machines (TBMs) were deployed from Civil Court side which reached Kasba Peth in July 2021 after digging below the Mutha River. The third TBM from Swargate side completed its breakthrough at Kasba Peth in June 2022. Along with the construction of the train station, a pedestrian subway was also built from Sattoti Chowk to connect with the metro facility.

== Station layout ==
G	Street level	Exit/ Entrance
M	Mezzanine	Fare control, station agent, Ticket/token, shops
P	Platform 1 Southbound	Towards → Swargate; Next Station: Mahatma Phule Mandai
P	Island platform | Doors will open on the right
P	Platform 2 Westbound	Towards ← PCMC Bhavan; Next Station: District Court

== See also ==
- Pune
- Maharashtra
- Rapid Transit in India
