= Dapodi metro station =

Pune Metro's Purple Line metro station

Dapodi
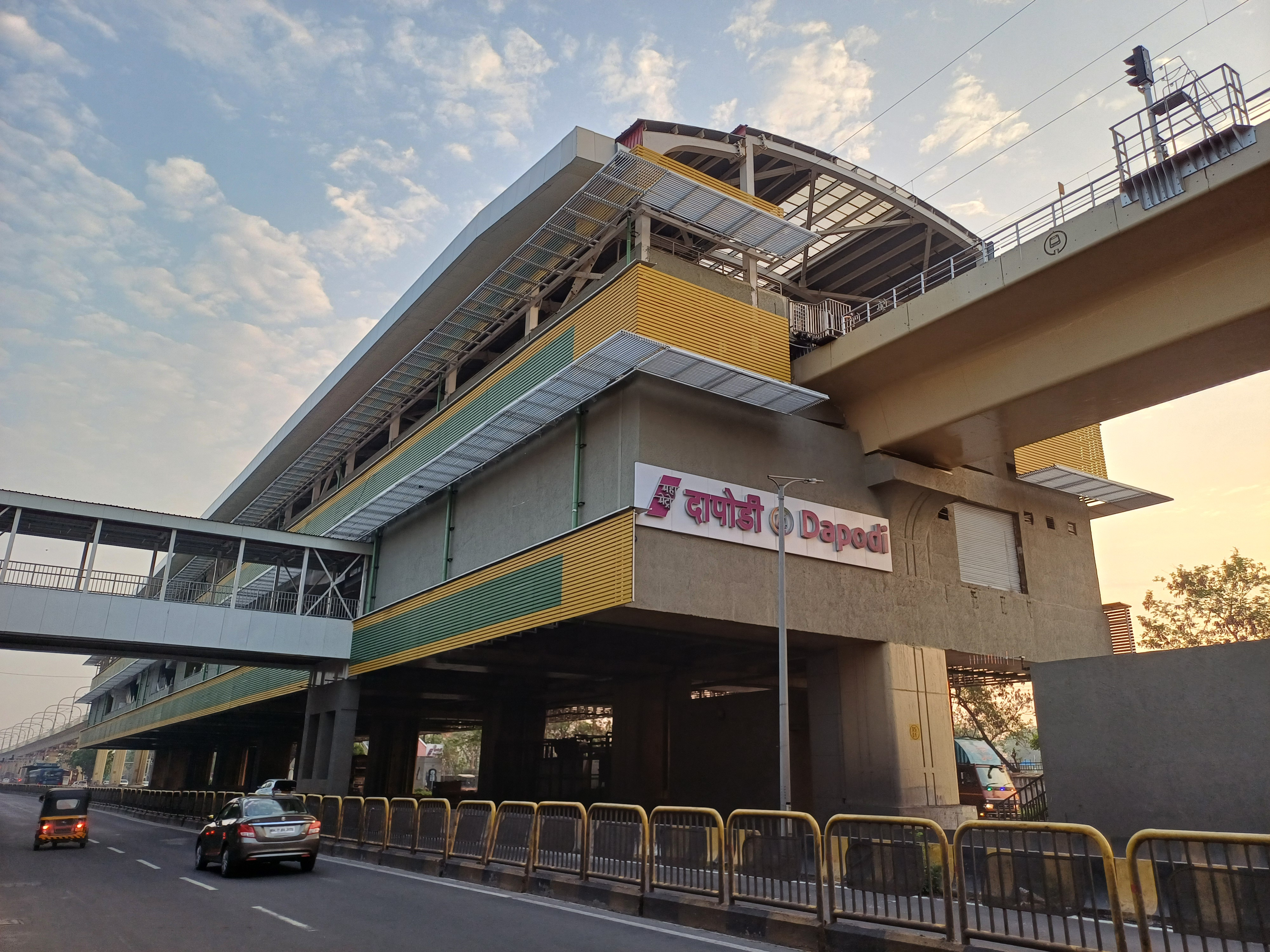

General information
- Location: Old Mumbai - Pune Hwy, Seva Nagar, Dapodi, Pimpri Chinchwad, Maharashtra 411012
- Coordinates: 18°35′02″N 73°50′02″E
- System: Pune Metro station
- Owner: Maharashtra Metro Rail Corporation Limited (MAHA-METRO)
- Operator: Pune Metro
- Line: Purple Line
- Platforms: Side platform Platform-1 → Swargate; Platform-2 → PCMC Bhavan
- Tracks: 2
- Connections: Dapodi

Construction
- Structure type: Elevated, Double track
- Platform levels: 2
- Accessible: Yes

Other information
- Station code: DDI

History
- Opened: 1 August 2023; 3 years ago
- Electrified: 25 kV 50 Hz AC overhead catenary

Services
Preceding station	Pune Metro	Following station
Phugewadi towards PCMC Bhavan	Purple Line	Bopodi towards Swargate
Route map
Location

Dapodi is an elevated metro station on the North-South corridor of the Purple Line of Pune Metro in Pimpri Chinchwad, India. The station was opened on 1 August 2023 as an extension of Pune Metro Phase I. Since then, this line was operational between PCMC and Civil Court. On 29 September 2024, the launch of Pune Metro Phase I was completed and the Purple Line was fully operational from PCMC to Swargate.

== Station layout ==
G	Street level	Exit/Entrance
L1	Mezzanine	Fare control, station agent, Metro Card vending machines, crossover
L2	Side platform | Doors will open on the left
L2	Platform 1 Southbound	Towards → Swargate; Next Station: Bopodi
L2	Platform 2 Northbound	Towards ← PCMC Bhavan; Next Station: Phugewadi
L2	Side platform | Doors will open on the left
L2

== See also ==
- Pune
- Maharashtra
- Rapid Transit in India
