= Lapa station (Porto Metro) =

Light rail station in Porto, Portugal

Lapa
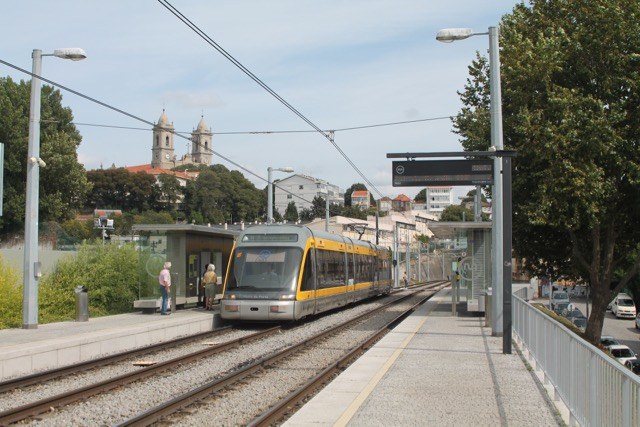
- Track and platforms looking east, with the entrance to Lapa tunnel in the background

General information
- Location: Porto; Portugal
- Coordinates: 41°09′26″N 8°37′00″W
- System: Porto Metro station
- Platforms: 2 side platforms
- Tracks: 2

Construction
- Structure type: At Grade
- Accessible: Yes

History
- Opened: 7 December 2002

Services
Preceding station	Porto Metro	Following station
Carolina Michaëlis towards Senhor de Matosinhos	Line A	Trindade towards Estádio do Dragão
Carolina Michaëlis towards Póvoa de Varzim	Line B	Trindade towards Estádio do Dragão
Carolina Michaëlis towards Póvoa de Varzim	Line Bx	Trindade towards Estádio do Dragão
Carolina Michaëlis towards ISMAI	Line C	Trindade towards Campanhã
Carolina Michaëlis towards Aeroporto	Line E	Trindade Terminus
Carolina Michaëlis towards Aeroporto	Line E Limited service	Trindade towards Estádio do Dragão
Carolina Michaëlis towards Senhora da Hora	Line F	Trindade towards Fânzeres
Location

Lapa is a light rail station on the Porto Metro system in Porto, Portugal. It was opened in 2002.

== History ==
The station was built in the corridor of the former 1,000 mm (3 ft 3 3/8 in) gauge Porto to Póvoa and Famalicão railway line that operated into the Porto-Trindade terminus. These lines dated from the opening of that terminus in 1938, and included the Lapa tunnel, which lies just to the east of Lapa station, and is now used by the Metro trains. The lines were closed in 2001 to enable the construction of the Metro.

The new station was inaugurated on 7 December 2002 and commercial services started on 1 January 2003. This section was initially served by the initial line A operating between terminals at Trindade and Senhor de Matosinhos. The line was extended eastwards from Trinidade to Estádio do Dragão on 5 June 2004. Using the same tracks, line B started operation on 13 March 2005, line C on 30 July 2005, line E on 27 May 2006, and line F on 2 January 2011.

== Services ==
Lapa is served by lines A, B, C, E and F (which run as one line within the metropolitan area). It is preceded by Trindade and followed by Carolina Michaëlis. Like other stations in the common section of lines A, B, C, E and F, Lapa sees a very frequent service, with up to 21 trains per hour in both directions.

The platforms are at ground level, with two through tracks served by two side platforms. Access is by ramps or stairs from Rua do Melo and Rua Padre Luís Rodrigues. To the east, the line enters the Lapa Tunnel as far as Trindade station, where it returns to the surface briefly to serve that station's line ABCEF platforms. In the Lapa Tunnel there is also a junction with a tunnelled single-track connection to the line D platforms of Trindade station, thus allowing out of service trams to travel between Lapa station and line D.
