= Mahatma Phule Mandai metro station =

Pune Metro's Purple Line metro station

Mahatma Phule Mandai
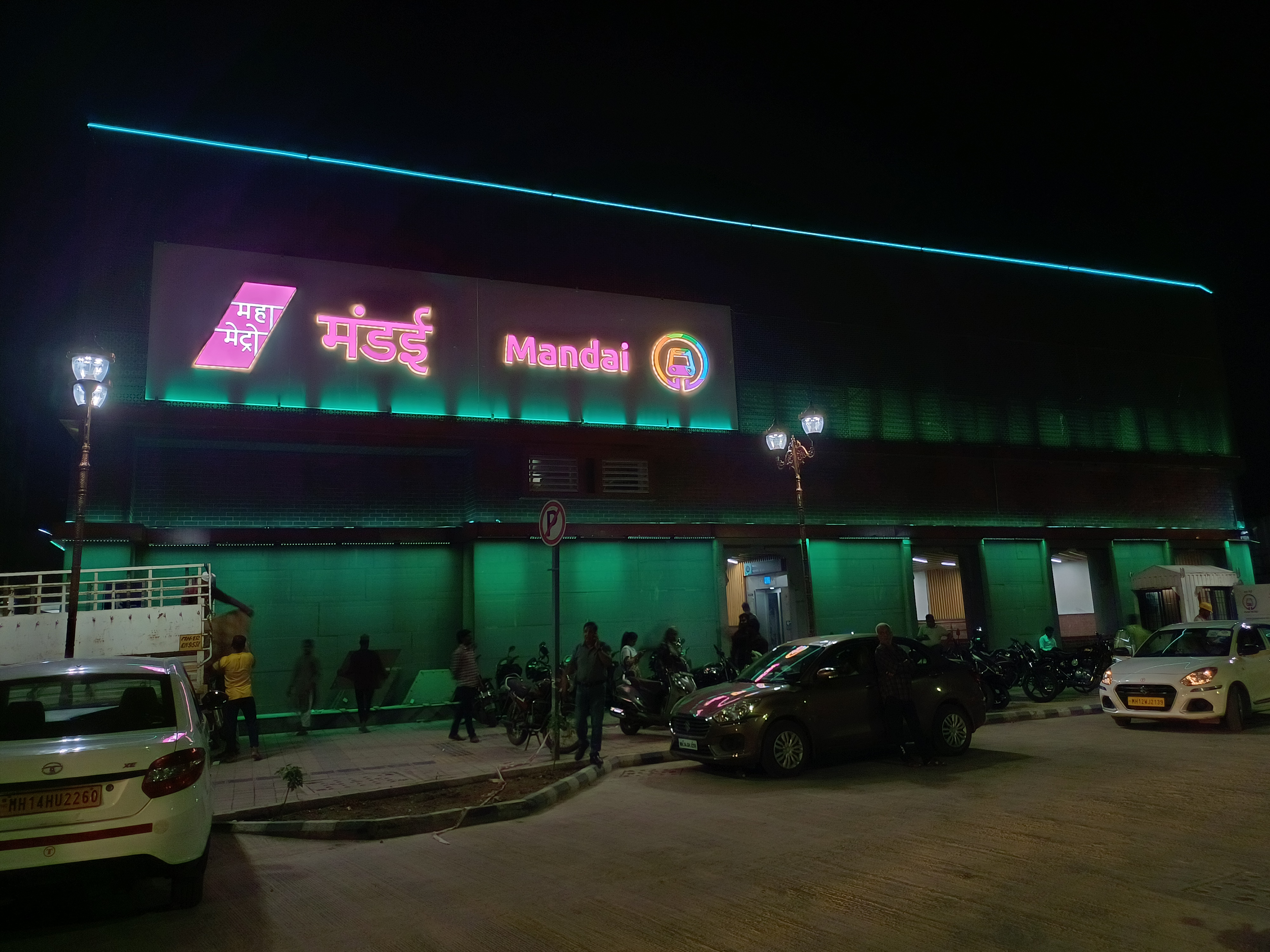

General information
- Location: Shukrawar Peth, Pune, Maharashtra 411002
- Coordinates: 18°30′47″N 73°51′25″E
- System: Pune Metro station
- Owner: Maharashtra Metro Rail Corporation Limited (MAHA-METRO)
- Operator: Pune Metro
- Line: Purple Line
- Platforms: Island platform Platform-1 → Swargate; Platform-2 → PCMC Bhavan
- Tracks: 2

Construction
- Structure type: Underground, Double track
- Platform levels: 2
- Accessible: Yes

Other information
- Station code: MNA

History
- Opened: 29 September 2024; 23 months ago
- Electrified: 25 kV 50 Hz AC overhead catenary

Services
Preceding station	Pune Metro	Following station
Kasba Peth towards PCMC Bhavan	Purple Line	Swargate Terminus
Route map
Location

Mahatma Phule Mandai (known as only Mandai until December 2025) is an underground metro station on the north–south corridor of the Purple Line of Pune Metro in Pune, India. The station was opened on 29 September 2024 as the final extension of Pune Metro Phase I. It was originally named after the towns district Mandai, which is surrounding it.

As per the initial plan, Mahatma Phule Mandai station is the longest among other Pune Metro stations spanning 248m long. The work on this station began after the commercial establishments which encroached the area were cleared by the Pune Municipal Corporation from the allocated space for construction. Two parallel tunnels being dug from Swargate metro station reached here in December 2021. In June 2022, Maha-Metro had placed iron decking on a patch of a road near the site to continue the subway excavation work without affecting the traffic movement. After the inauguration of the metro services at this station, the PMC undertook a ₹1.25 crore plan to improve the surrounding area of Mandai.

A fire had broken out at the metro station around midnight on 21 October 2024. It was caused due to the insulating foam material in the air-conditioning ducts which caught the sparks from the ongoing welding work. No injuries were reported due this incident and the train operations resumed at the scheduled time of 6am later in the day.

In December 2025, the station was renamed into Mahatma Phule Mandai to honour the well-known social reformer Jyotirao Phule, which lived nearby.

== Station layout ==
G	Street level	Exit/ Entrance
M	Mezzanine	Fare control, station agent, Ticket/token, shops
P	Platform 1 Southbound	Towards → Swargate; Next Station: Swargate
P	Island platform | Doors will open on the right
P	Platform 2 Westbound	Towards ← PCMC Bhavan; Next Station: Kasba Peth

== See also ==
- Pune
- Maharashtra
- Rapid Transit in India
