= Shivaji Nagar metro station (Pune) =

Pune Metro's Purple and Pink Line metro station

Shivaji Nagar
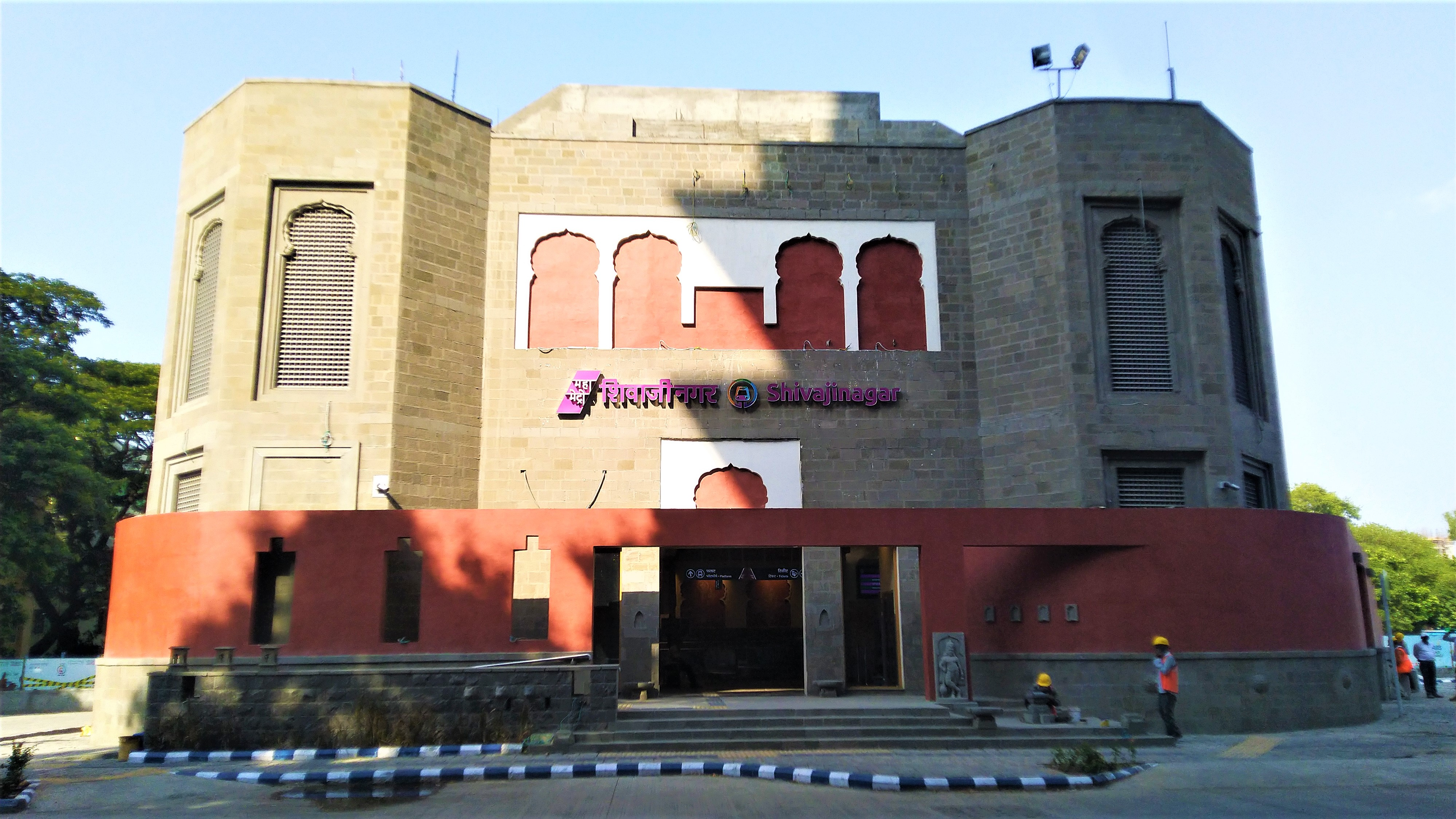

General information
- Location: Shivajinagar, Pune, Maharashtra, 411001
- Coordinates: 18°31′58″N 73°50′58″E
- System: Pune Metro station
- Owner: Maharashtra Metro Rail Corporation Limited (Maha Metro)
- Operator: Pune Metro
- Lines: Purple Line; Pink Line
- Platforms: Island platform Platform-1 → Swargate; Platform-2 → PCMC Bhavan; Side platform Platform-3 → Megapolis Circle; Platform-4 → Civil Court
- Tracks: 2
- Connections: Shivaji Nagar

Construction
- Structure type: Underground, Elevated Double track
- Platform levels: 2
- Accessible: Yes

Other information
- Station code: SJO

History
- Opened: 1 August 2023; 3 years ago
- Electrified: 25 kV 50 Hz AC overhead catenary

Services
Preceding station	Pune Metro	Following station
Khadki towards PCMC Bhavan	Purple Line	Civil Court towards Swargate
Preceding station	Pune Metro	Following station
Agriculture College towards Maan	Pink Line	Civil Court Terminus
Route map
Location

Shivaji Nagar is an underground metro station on the North-South corridor of the Purple Line and North-South corridor of the Pink Line of Pune Metro in Pune, India. The station was opened on 1 August 2023 as an extension of Pune Metro Phase I. Since then, this line was operational between PCMC and Civil Court. On 29 September 2024, the launch of Pune Metro Phase I was completed and the Purple Line was fully operational from PCMC to Swargate. This station will serve as an interchange for Pink Line of Pune Metro which will operate from Civil Court to Megapolis Circle.

The station contains 5 lifts, 12 escalators and a tunnel ventilation system. Its exterior is inspired by a fort from the era of Shivaji Maharaj, whereas the interior features elements from the Peshwa era. Two subways have been proposed to connect the metro station with Shivaji Nagar railway station and University Road. The work on Line 3 from Shivajinagar to Hinjawadi is being executed under a public–private partnership model with Tata Group and Siemens. It is expected to be fully operational from April 2025.

== Station layout ==
G
Street level
Exit/ Entrance
M
Mezzanine
Fare control, station agent, Ticket/token, shops
P
Platform 1
Southbound
Towards → Swargate

Next Station: Civil Court Change at the next station for Aqua Line

Island platform | Doors will open on the right
Platform 2
Westbound
Towards ← PCMC Bhavan
Next Station: Khadki

== Gallery ==
Interior of the station is inspired by traditional Maratha and Peshwa architecture

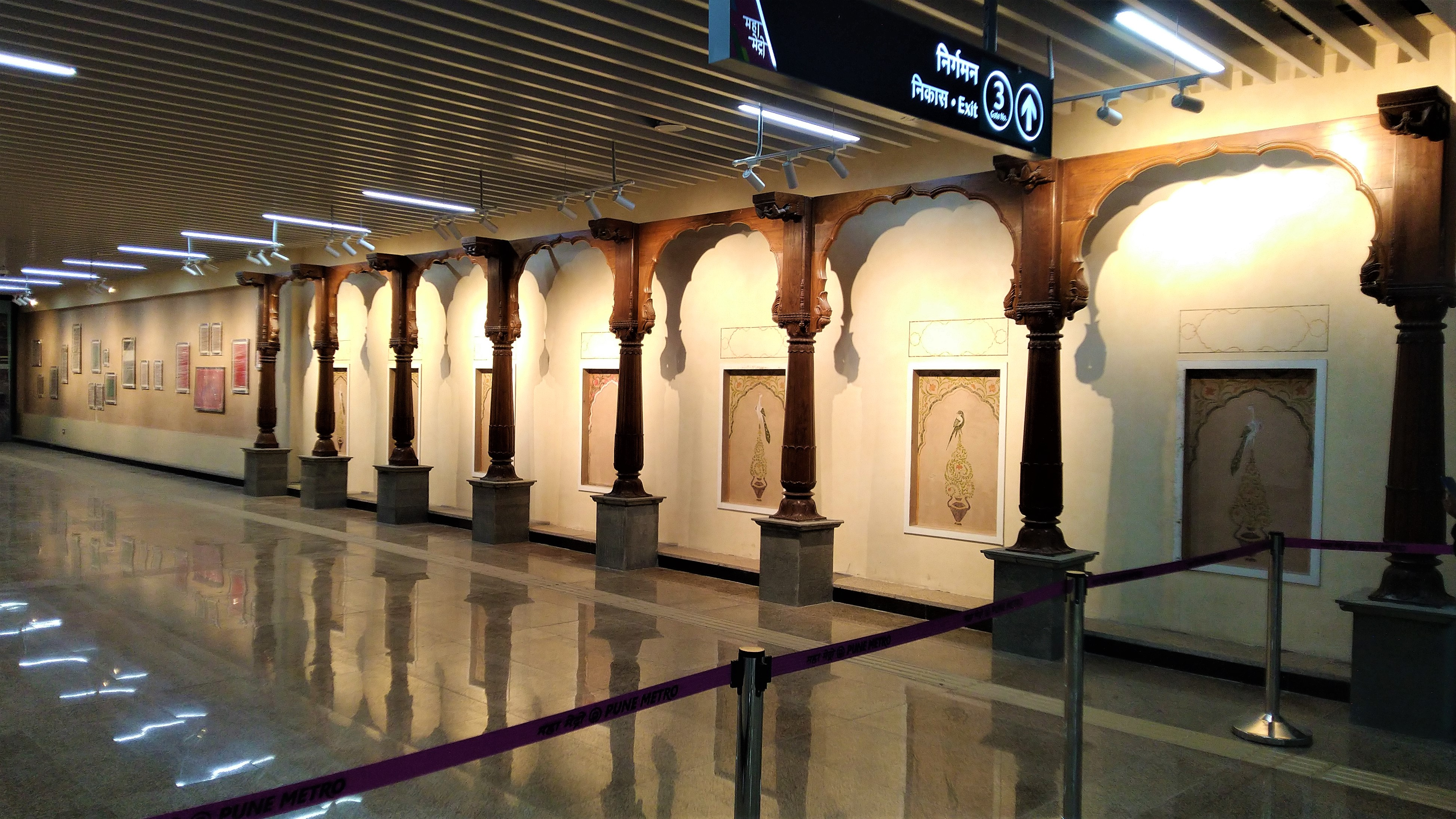

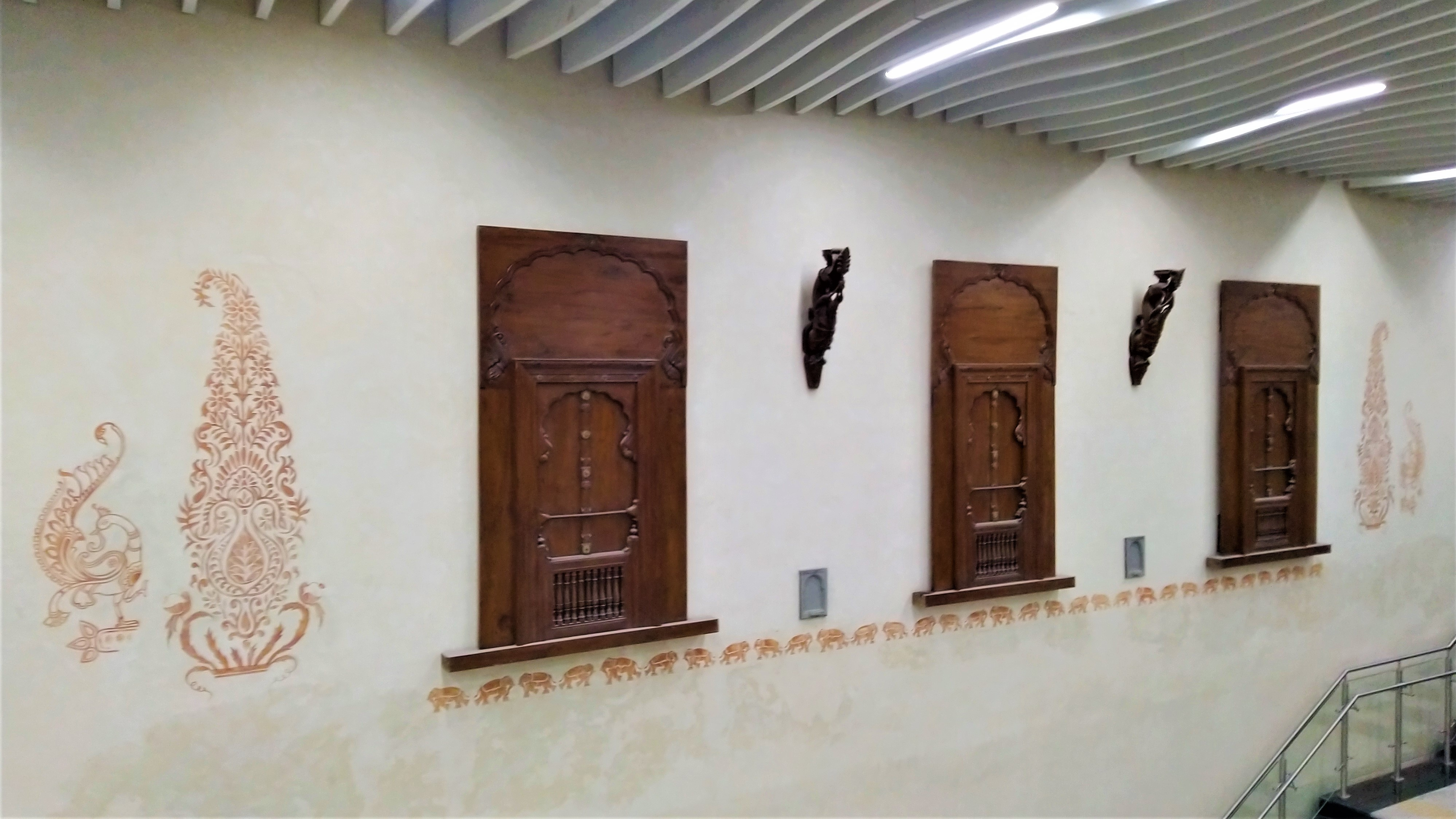

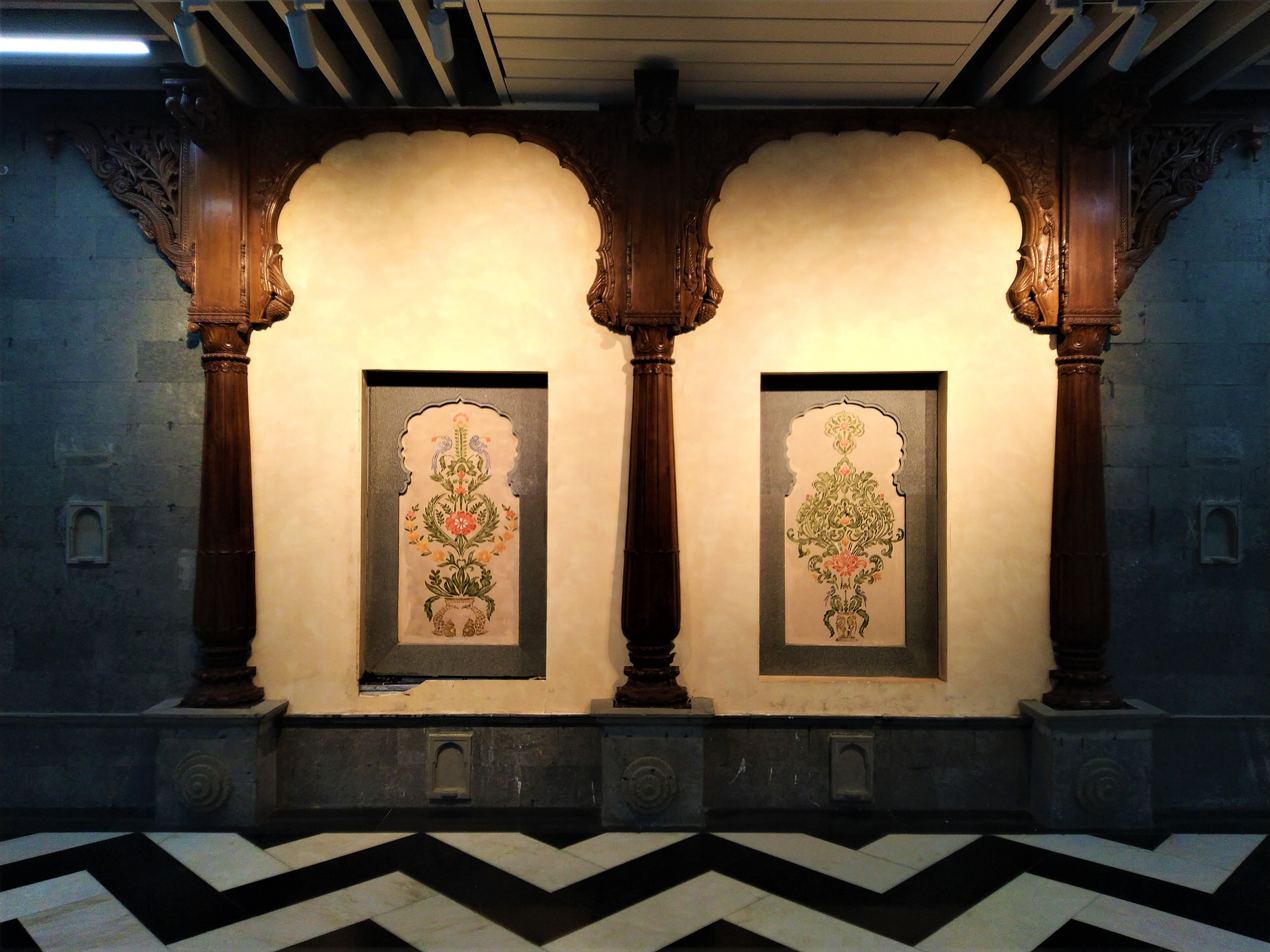

== See also ==
- Pune
- Maharashtra
- Rapid Transit in India
