= Carolina Michaëlis station =

Light rail station on the Porto Metro in Porto, Portugal

Carolina Michaëlis
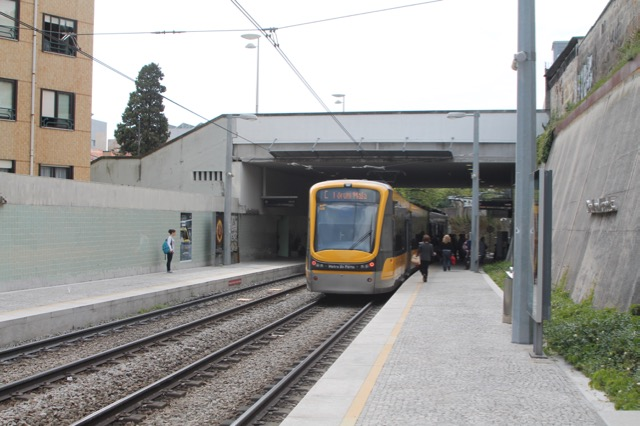
- Track and platforms looking west, with the Carolina Michaëlis de Vasconcelos stairway above the train

General information
- Location: Porto; Portugal
- Coordinates: 41°09′31″N 8°37′18.93″W
- System: Porto Metro station
- Platforms: 2 side platforms
- Tracks: 2

Construction
- Structure type: At Grade / Underground
- Accessible: Yes

History
- Opened: 7 December 2002

Services
Preceding station	Porto Metro	Following station
Casa da Música towards Senhor de Matosinhos	Line A	Lapa towards Estádio do Dragão
Casa da Música towards Póvoa de Varzim	Line B	Lapa towards Estádio do Dragão
Casa da Música towards Póvoa de Varzim	Line Bx	Lapa towards Estádio do Dragão
Casa da Música towards ISMAI	Line C	Lapa towards Campanhã
Casa da Música towards Aeroporto	Line E	Lapa towards Trindade or Estádio do Dragão
Casa da Música towards Senhora da Hora	Line F	Lapa towards Fânzeres
Location

Carolina Michaëlis is a light rail station on the Porto Metro system in Porto, Portugal. The station is partly underground, beneath the Carolina Michaëlis de Vasconcelos stairway and in front of the Carolina Michaëlis Secondary School. It was opened in 2002.

== History ==
The station was built in the corridor of the former 1,000 mm (3 ft 3 3/8 in) gauge Porto to Póvoa and Famalicão railway line that operated into the Porto-Trindade terminus. These lines dated from the opening of that terminus in 1938, and were closed in 2001 to enable the construction of the Metro.

The new station was inaugurated on 7 December 2002 and commercial services started on 1 January 2003. This section was initially served by the initial line A operating between terminals at Trindade and Senhor de Matosinhos. The line was extended eastwards from Trinidade to Estádio do Dragão on 5 June 2004. Using the same tracks, line B started operation on 13 March 2005, line C on 30 July 2005, line E on 27 May 2006, and line F on 2 January 2011.

== Services ==
Carolina Michaëlis is served by lines A, B, C, E and F (which run as one line within the metropolitan area). It is preceded by Lapa and followed by Casa da Música. Like other stations in the common section of lines A, B, C, E and F, Carolina Michaëlis sees a very frequent service, with up to 21 trains per hour in both directions.

The station is located along a slope between the Rua da Infanta Dona Maria, to the north and above the platforms, and the Rua de Oliveira Monteiro, to the south and below. It is partly covered by the Carolina Michaëlis de Vasconcelos stairway, which links the two streets, and has two through tracks served by two side platforms. Access is by lift or stairs.

== Gallery ==
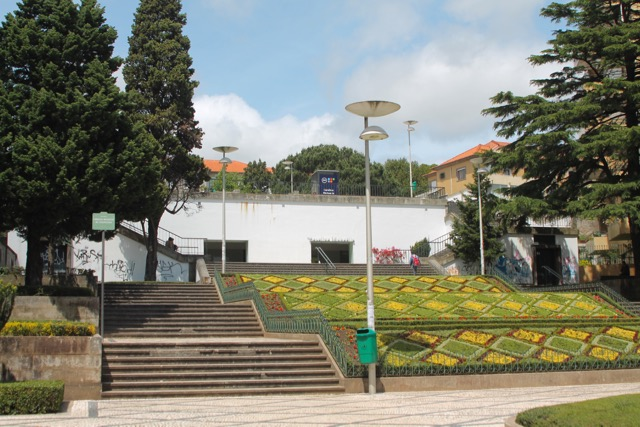
Station entrance from Rua de Oliveira Monteiro

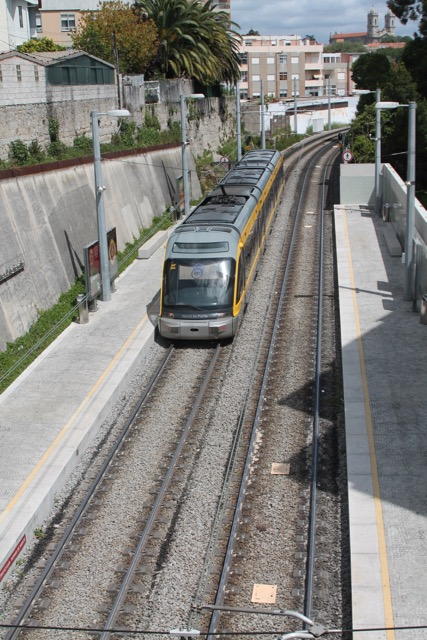
Station from above

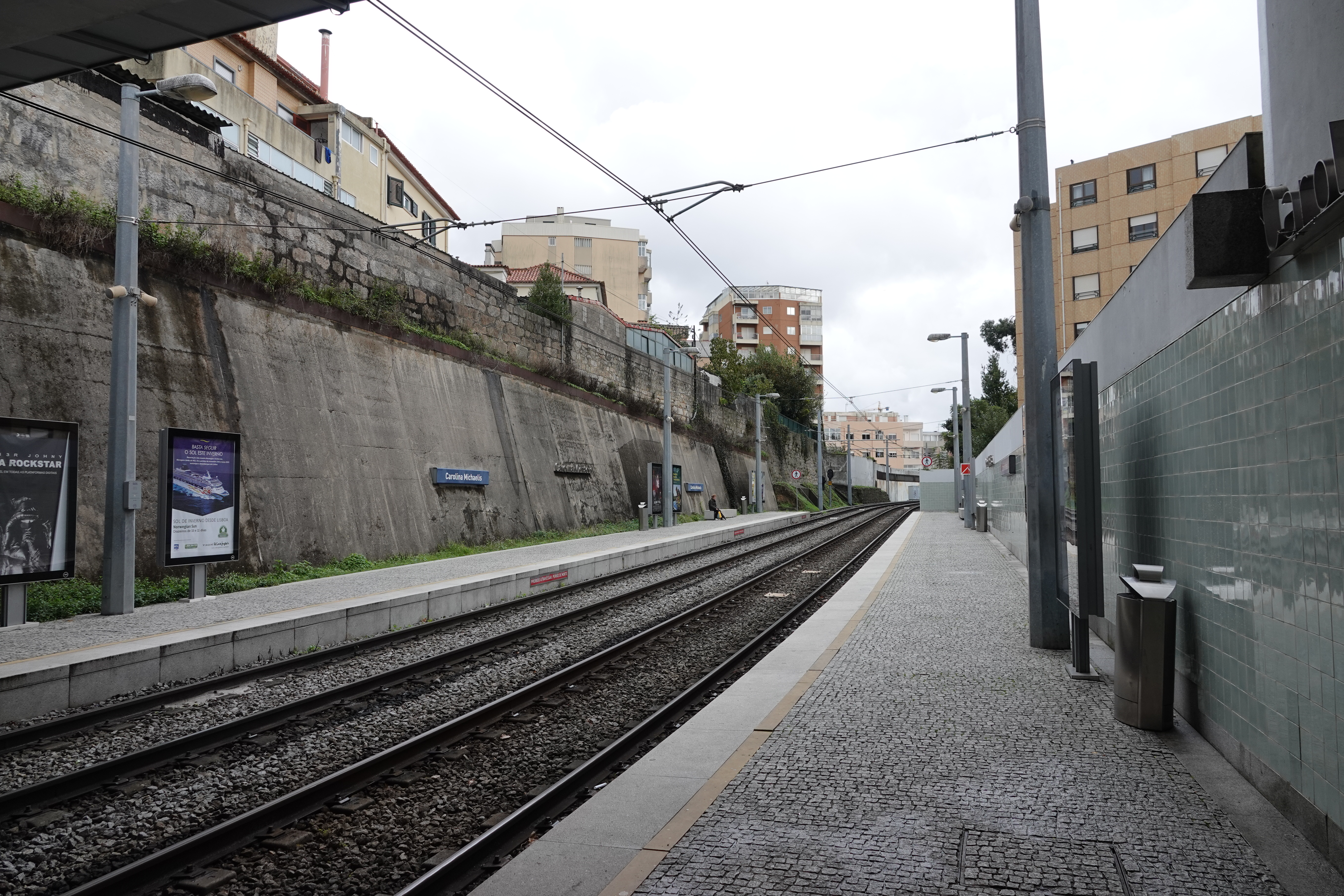
The station platforms
