= Ulrychów station =

Ulrychów station may refer to:

- Ulrychów metro station, metro station in Warsaw
- Warszawa Ulrychów railway station, main line rail station in Warsaw
