= Casa da Música station =

Light rail station in Porto, Portugal

Casa da Música
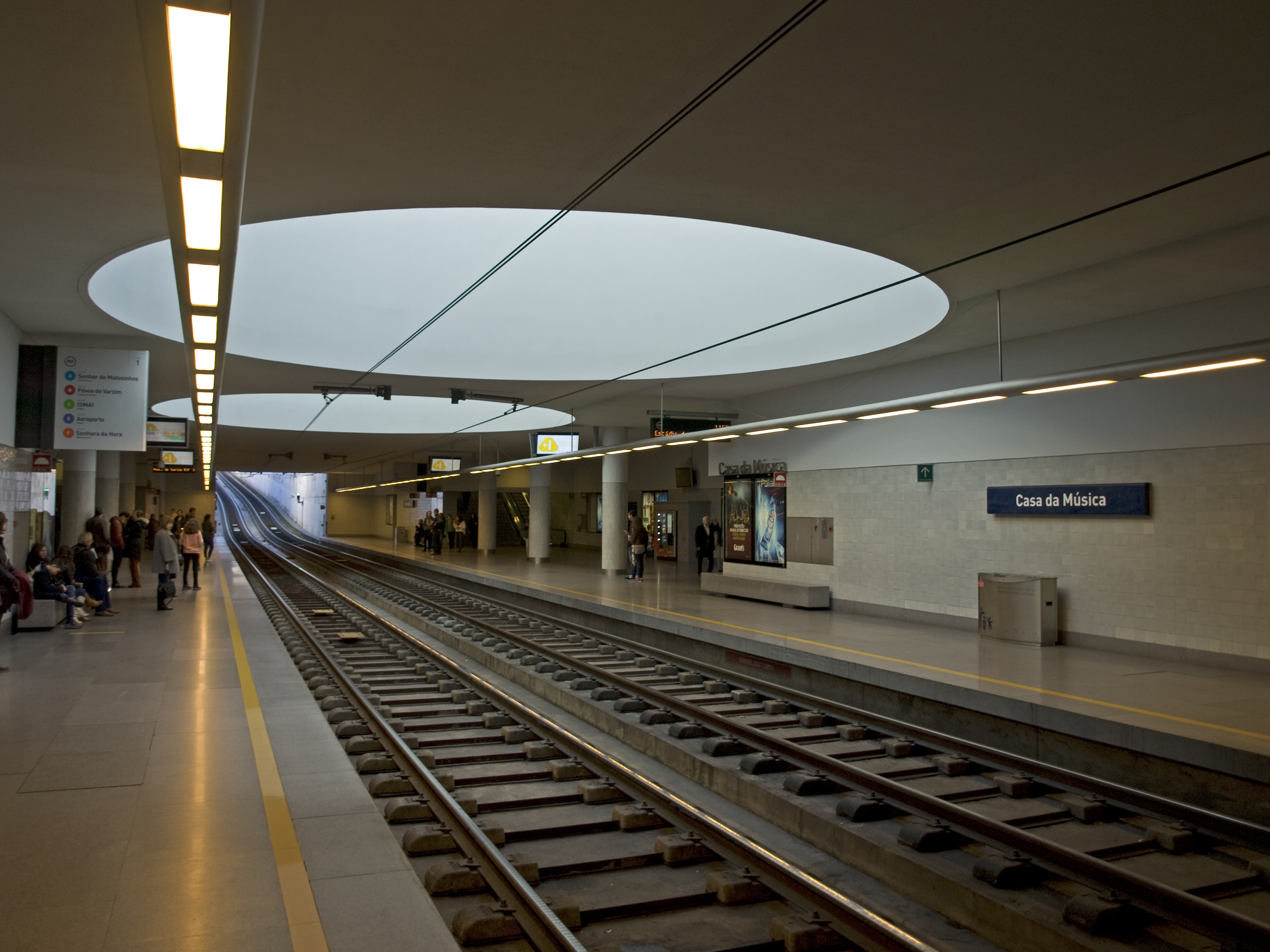
- Station platforms

General information
- Location: Porto; Portugal
- Coordinates: 41°09′39″N 8°37′45″W
- System: Porto Metro station
- Platforms: 2 side platforms
- Tracks: 2

Construction
- Structure type: Underground
- Accessible: Yes

History
- Opened: 7 December 2002

Services
Preceding station	Porto Metro	Following station
Francos towards Senhor de Matosinhos	Line A	Carolina Michaëlis towards Estádio do Dragão
Francos towards Póvoa de Varzim	Line B	Carolina Michaëlis towards Estádio do Dragão
Francos towards Póvoa de Varzim	Line Bx	Carolina Michaëlis towards Estádio do Dragão
Francos towards ISMAI	Line C	Carolina Michaëlis towards Campanhã
Francos towards Aeroporto	Line E	Carolina Michaëlis towards Trindade or Estádio do Dragão
Francos towards Senhora da Hora	Line F	Carolina Michaëlis towards Fânzeres

Future services
Preceding station	Porto Metro	Following station
Galiza towards São Bento	Line G	Terminus
Terminus	Line H	Campo Alegre towards Santo Ovídio
Guerra Junqueiro towards Império	MetroBus Line 1	Terminus
Location

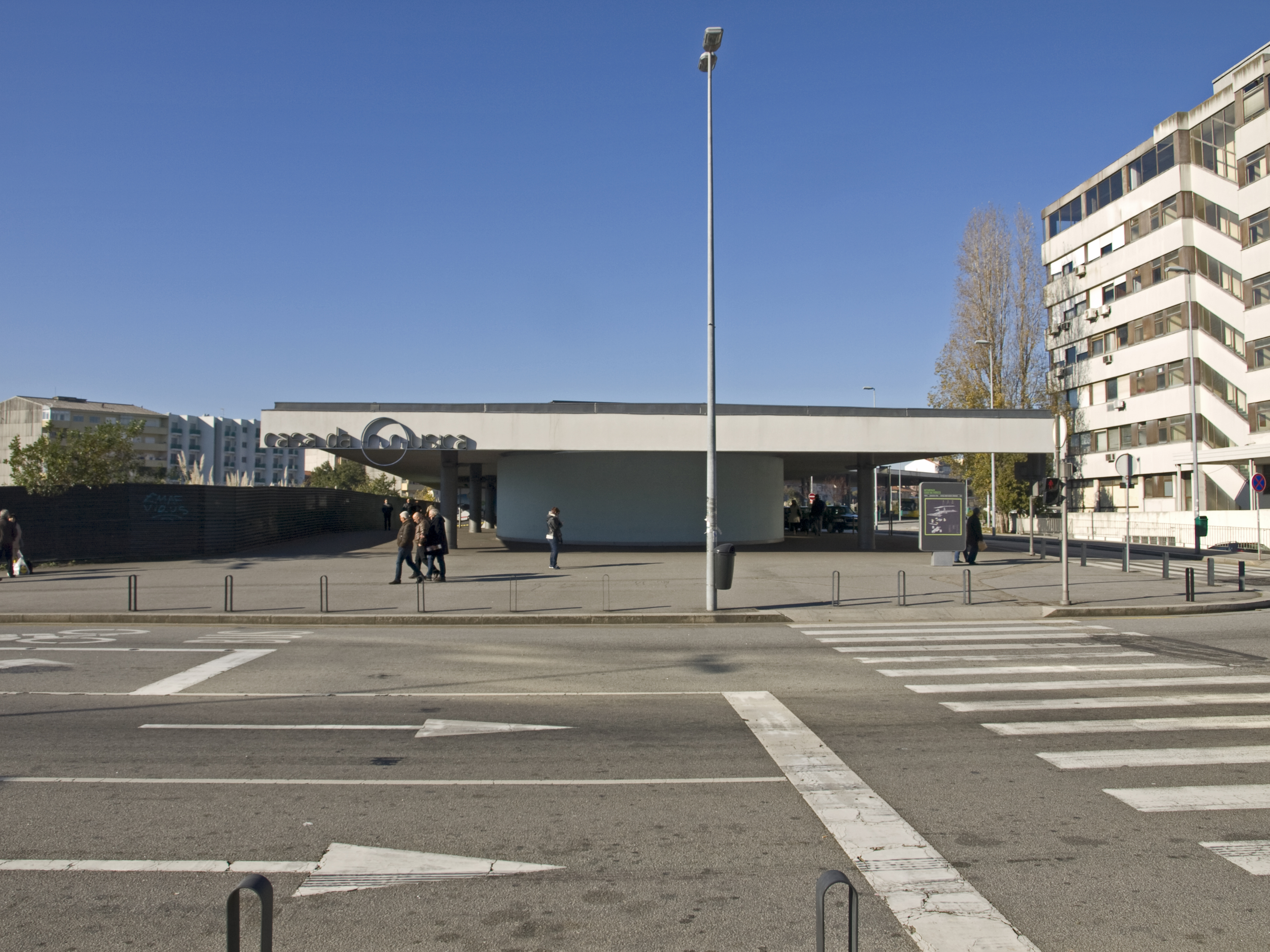
The station viewed from Avenida da França

Casa da Música is an underground light rail station on the Porto Metro system in Porto, Portugal. It is situated on the Avenida da França and takes its name from the nearby Casa da Música concert hall.

== History ==
The station was built on the site of the former Avenida da França station on the 1,000 mm (3 ft 3 3/8 in) gauge Porto to Póvoa and Famalicão railway line that operated into the Porto-Trindade terminus. This station and line dated from the opening of that terminus in 1938, and before then the line terminated at Porto-Boavista, just to the south of Casa da Música station. Avenida da França station and the line into Trindade station were closed in 2001 to enable the construction of the Metro.

The new station was designed by Eduardo Souto de Moura, who also designed the Metro's Trindade station. It was inaugurated on 7 December 2002 and commercial services started on 1 January 2003. This section was initially served by the initial line A operating between terminals at Trindade and Senhor de Matosinhos. The line was extended eastwards from Trinidade to Estádio do Dragão on 5 June 2004. Using the same tracks, line B started operation on 13 March 2005, line C on 30 July 2005, line E on 27 May 2006, and line F on 2 January 2011.

== Services ==
Casa da Música is served by lines A, B, C, E and F (which run as one line within the metropolitan area). It is preceded by Carolina Michaëlis and followed by Francos. Like other stations in the common section of lines A, B, C, E and F, Casa da Música sees a very frequent service, with up to 21 trains per hour in both directions.

The rail station has an attached bus station, and is served by a number of international, long distance and city bus routes.

== Future ==
Plans were announced in 2017 to build an underground Line G which would connect Casa da Música with São Bento. The construction started in 2020 and Porto Metro expects it to be completed in early 2027.

Plans were announced in 2022 to build line H to connect Casa da Música to Santo Ovídio on line D. The construction is planned to start by the end of 2023 and to be completed in 2028.
