= Purple Line (Pune Metro) =

Rapid transit line in Maharashtra, India

Purple Line (Line 1)
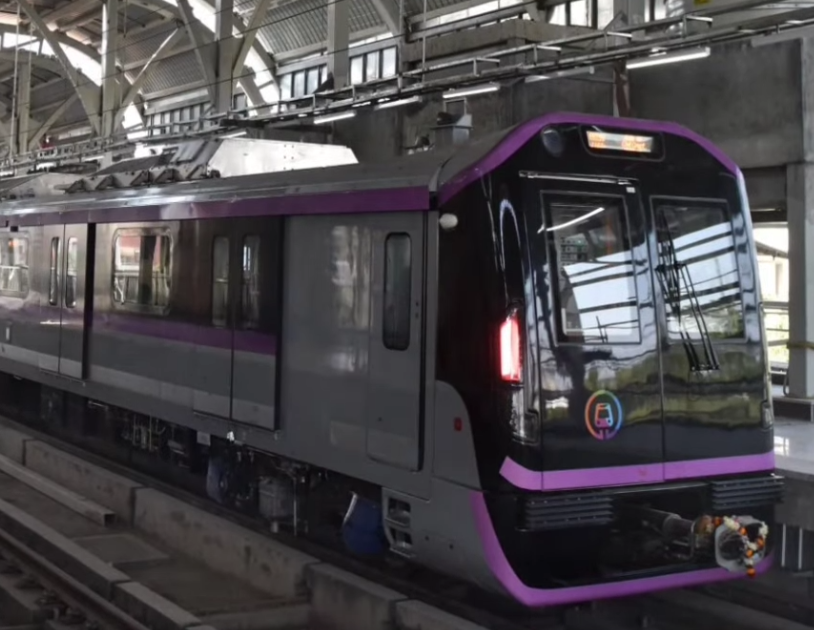
- Purple Line Metro Train

Overview
- Status: Operational
- Locale: Pune Metropolitan Region
- Termini: PCMC Bhavan; Swargate
- Stations: 13 (Operational)

Service
- Type: Rapid Transit
- System: Pune Metro
- Operator: MahaMetro
- Rolling stock: Titagarh Firema

History
- Opened: 6 March 2022; 4 years ago

Technical
- Line length: 16.59 km (Operational); 9.2 km (Under Construction)
- Character: Elevated & Underground

The Purple Line (Line 1) of the Pune Metro is the first line of the city's mass transit network. It runs from PCMC Bhavan to Swargate. The 16.59 km (10.31 mi) line is elevated till Range Hills with 9 stations and further goes underground up to Swargate with 5 stations.

== Planning ==
The line goes via Kasarwadi (Nashik Phata), Khadki and Shivajinagar. The maintenance depot for the Purple Line is located near the Range Hills station on the land acquired from the College of Agriculture.

=== Initial Proposal ===
On 15 August 2008, the preparation of Detailed Project Report (DPR) work was undertaken by the Delhi Metro Rail Corporation (DMRC) and submitted their report. The DPR proposed two corridors, one of which included a line running from PCMC to Swargate. The line, which was referred to as Corridor 1 before being given the name "Purple" was proposed to span 16.589 km (10.308 mi) of which 11.570 km (7.189 mi) was elevated and 5.019 km (3.119 mi) was underground. The DPR also proposed 15 stations of which 6 were underground and 9 were elevated. However, the DPR had to be modified and updated several times before it was finally sent to the state and central government. The DPR was finally approved by the State in June 2012. However, it received the final approval from the Central Government only on 7 December 2016, almost 4.5 years later.

=== Bhakti Shakti Extension ===
In January 2018 PCMC leadership and local MLA's began demanding extension of the metro line from PCMC to Bhakti Shakti. Many civil groups soon started protesting for the extension. Following the increasing public demand PCMC allocated a portion of their budget to Maha Metro to prepare a DPR for the Bhakti Shakti extension. In October 2018, Maha Metro submitted the DPR to the PCMC Standing Committee. The DPR proposed a 4.519 km (2.808 mi) elevated extension with 4 stations and an estimated cost of ₹1,253 crore (US$130 million). The State government then approved the extension in February 2021 and the extension received its final approval from the Central government on 23 October 2023.

In late 2023 to early 2024 Maha Metro awarded several tenders for the line. The detailed design consultancy was awarded LKT Engineering for ₹1.11 crore (US$120,000) while the construction of 4.519 km (2.808 mi) viaduct was awarded to RVNL for a cost of ₹339.23 crore (US$36 million). Maha Metro later released tenders for the construction of the 4 stations, which is still under tendering process.

=== Katraj Extension ===
In January 2018 the Pune Municipal Corporation (PMC) approved Maha Metro to prepare a Detailed Project Report (DPR) for extending the Purple Line from Swargate to Katraj. The DPR was later submitted to the PMC in January 2020. The DPR proposed a 5.464 km (3.395 mi) extensions with 3 stations costing a total of ₹4,283.72 crore (US$460 million). Later on 17 March 2020, the extension was approved by PMC's standing committee. The DPR was then forwarded to the general committee who approved the extension in March 2021, who then forwarded it to the state government. The state government then approved the extension in April 2022 and it received its final approval from the central government on 16 August 2024. was approved by the State in June 2012. However, it received the final approval from the Central Government only on 7 December 2016,

However, following public consultations, there was significant backlash regarding the long distance between the stations. To address this concern, two additional stations—Balaji Nagar and Bibwewadi—were proposed.. The revised proposal would increase the cost by ₹683 crore (US$73 million). The state government later announced it would take the financial burden of funding the two additional stations. Mahametro later revised the tender to include the construction of two additional stations.

== Construction ==
Soil testing and topographical surveys of the concerned areas started in late December 2016. Excavation work for erection of pillars began in early June, 2017. The construction of the first pillar was completed by October 2017 and construction work of up to ten pillars was underway. The first viaduct was completely erected by January 2018. The first batch of tracks were laid between PCMC and Sant Tukaram Nagar in the second week of July 2019.

== List of stations ==
Following is a list of stations on this route:

Purple Line
#	Station Name		Opening	Connections	Layout
#	English	Marathi	Opening	Connections	Layout
1	Bhakti Shakti	भक्ती शक्ती	Under Construction	Rainbow BRTS	Elevated
2	Nigdi	निगडी	Under Construction	Rainbow BRTS	Elevated
3	Akurdi	आकुर्डी	Under Construction	Akurdi Rainbow BRTS	Elevated
4	Chinchwad	चिंचवड	Under Construction	Chinchwad Rainbow BRTS	Elevated
5	PCMC Bhavan	पिंपरी-चिंचवड महानगरपालिका भवन	6 March 2022	Rainbow BRTS	Elevated
6	Sant Tukaram Nagar	संत तुकाराम नगर	6 March 2022	Rainbow BRTS Vallabhnagar MSRTC Bus Station	Elevated
7	Nashik Phata	नाशिक फाटा	6 March 2022	Rainbow BRTS	Elevated
8	Kasarwadi	कासारवाडी	6 March 2022	Kasarwadi Rainbow BRTS	Elevated
9	Phugewadi	फुगेवाडी	6 March 2022	Rainbow BRTS	Elevated
10	Dapodi	दापोडी	1 August 2023	Dapodi Rainbow BRTS	Elevated
11	Bopodi	बोपोडी	1 August 2023	None	Elevated
12	Khadki	खडकी	21 June 2025	Khadki	Elevated
13	Range Hills	रेंज हिल्स	Under Construction	None	Elevated
14	Shivaji Nagar	शिवाजी नगर	1 August 2023	Shivaji Nagar Shivaji Nagar MSRTC Bus Station & Pink Line (Under Construction)	Underground
15	District Court Pune	जिल्हा न्यायालय पुणे	1 August 2023	Aqua Line & Pink Line	Underground
16	Kasba Peth	कसबा पेठ	29 September 2024	None	Underground
17	Mahatma Phule Mandai	महात्मा फुले मंडई	29 September 2024	None	Underground
18	Swargate	स्वारगेट	29 September 2024	Rainbow BRTS Swargate Bus Station & Line 4	Underground
19	Market Yard	मार्केट यार्ड	Under Construction	None	Underground
20	Bibwewadi	बिबवेवाडी	Under Construction	None	Underground
21	Padmavati	पद्मावती	Under Construction	None	Underground
22	Balaji Nagar	बालाजी नगर	Under Construction	None	Underground
23	Katraj	कात्रज	Under Construction	None	Underground

== Infrastructure ==
=== Signalling ===
The Purple Line utilises the Alstom Urbalis 400 communications-based train control (CBTC) signalling system. Alstom was awarded a EUR90 million contract to supply the signalling and telecommunications systems for the Purple and Aqua Lines, as well as Mumbai Metro Line 2 and Line 7.

== Incidents ==
On 21 October around 12AM, a fire struck at Mandai metro station. Located in the heart of the vegetable market in Pune. Fire Brigade reached the station and reported that the fire was caused by the Welding works at the station. No casualties were reported as no trains were running during the morning hours.
