= Chelyabinsk Metrotram =

Rapid transit line under construction in Chelyabinsk, Russia

Overview
- Native name: Челябинский метротрамвай Chelyabinskiy metrotramvay
- Locale: Chelyabinsk, Russia
- Transit type: Light rail
- Number of lines: 1
- Number of stations: 4 (start); 8 (planned)

Operation
- Operation will start: December 2025

Technical
- System length: 5.7 km (3.5 mi) (start)
- Track gauge: 1,520 mm (4 ft 11 27/32 in)
System map
Map of planned Chelyabinsk Metro (initial segment under construction in dark red).

Chelyabinsk Metrotram (Russian: Челябинский метротрамвай, romanized: Chelyabinskiy metrotramvay) is an underground light rail system under construction in Chelyabinsk, Russia. Envisioned as a metro system in the 1960s, construction on the inaugural line began in 1992.

After the project suffered various financial reverses in the 1990s and early 2000s, the first three stations were originally scheduled to open in 2007. But the opening was then postponed to 2010. In 2007, a decision was made to open the first line in 2014, with the project now consisting of four stations initially instead of three. As funding for the project continued to be intermittent, the opening date was pushed back again. As of 2018, an exact opening date would not occur before 2026.

As of February 2010, some 3.6 kilometers (2.2 mi) of tunnel has been made, out of a total 5.7 kilometers (3.5 mi). In 2017, the head of the city's construction authority reported that one station, Torgovy Tsentr was about 70% complete and that three other stations were still envisioned.

At the end of 2021, the Russian government canceled construction due to lack of money, now there will be a tram.

== Lines and stations ==
The current plans include opening the following four stations, along with a depot:

- Komsomolskaya ploshyad' (Komsomolskaya Square)
- Ploshyad' Revolutsii (Revolution Square)
- Torgovi tsentr (Trade Centre)
- Prospekt Pobedi (Victory Avenue)

The total length of tunnels will be 5.7 kilometers (3.5 mi), with an additional 1 kilometer (0.62 mi) track to the depot.

In November, 2011, the first station structure (of Komsomolskaya ploshyad') was finished.

=== Future plans ===
Further plans include expanding the first line east to the Chelyabinsk Tractor Plant (one station), and west (3 stations).

Two more lines running from north to southeast and from northeast to southwest are planned longer-term; the time frame for their construction is undefined.

== Financing the project ==
In March 1998, before the 1998 Russian financial crisis, Pyotr Sumin, governor of the Chelyabinsk province, called the Chelyabinsk Metro one of the most important construction projects in the region. Construction companies in arrears on their taxes to the local and federal governments offered their services to build the Metro in lieu of payment. The project was therefore being financed by the tax debt of the construction companies to various government bodies. Now it is funded jointly by the governments of Russia, Chelyabinsk Oblast and the city of Chelyabinsk, allocating in total around $40 mln a year.

In 2018, the government estimated that it will take about 80 billion rubles to complete the project, on top of the 11 billion rubles that the authorities have already invested. The government considered forming a joint request with Krasnoyarsk and Omsk, which also have unfinished metros (Krasnoyarsk Metro and Omsk Metro), to secure the needed funds for all three projects.

== Criticism ==
The project was initially due to be completed by 2000, but has been postponed several times due to lack of financing.

The construction plan was developed many years ago and as the city has expanded and transport needs have changed greatly, critics argue that the initial stations will be of little help in reducing traffic congestion or improving the transportation system.

Alternative projects such as light rail or surface trains have been rejected.
