= Santo Ovídio station =

Light rail station on the Porto Metro in Porto, Portugal

Santo Ovídio
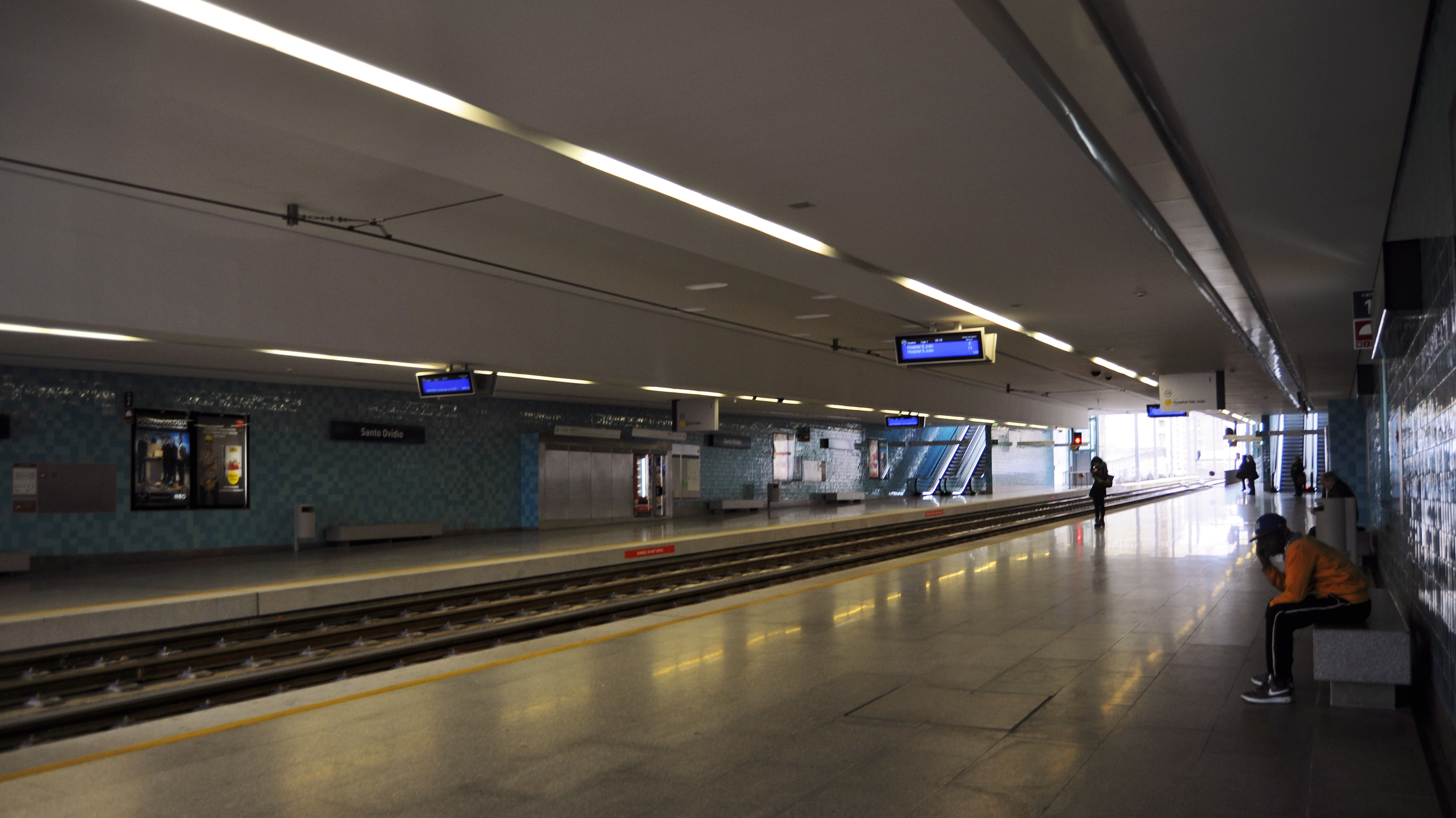
- The station platforms

General information
- Location: Vila Nova de Gaia; Portugal
- Coordinates: 41°6′56″N 8°36′23.52″W
- System: Porto Metro station

Construction
- Structure type: Underground
- Accessible: Yes

History
- Opened: 15 October 2011

Services
Preceding station	Porto Metro	Following station
D. João II towards Hospital de São João	Line D	Manuel Leão towards Vila d'Este

Future services
Preceding station	Porto Metro	Following station
Soares dos Reis towards Casa da Música	Line H	Terminus
Location

Santo Ovídio is a light rail station on line D of the Porto Metro system in Vila Nova de Gaia, Portugal. The station is situated underground, below the junction between Av. da República, R. de Soares dos Reis, R. Conceição Fernandes and R. António Rodrigues Rocha. To the north the line runs in the centre of Av. da República, whist to the south it climbs onto an elevated structure.

Santo Ovídio station opened, along with the extension of line D from its previous terminus at D. João II, on 15 October 2011. It served as the terminus of line D until 28 June 2024, when the line was further extended to Vila d'Este. Plans were announced in 2022 to build a new line of the Porto Metro (line H) to connect Santo Ovídio to Casa da Música on lines A, B, C, E and F. The construction is planned to start by the end of 2023 and to be completed by the end of 2026.

The station is preceded by D. João II and followed by Manuel Leão. To the north of Santo Ovídio, towards Porto, trains run every 5 to 6 minutes, declining to every 10 minutes on weekends and evenings. Alternate trains from the north still terminate at Santo Ovídio, meaning that towards Vila d'Este trains run every 10 to 12 minutes, declining to every 20 minutes on weekends and evenings.

The underground station has two tracks, served by two side platforms. Access to the street is by a stairs, escalators, lifts and ramps.

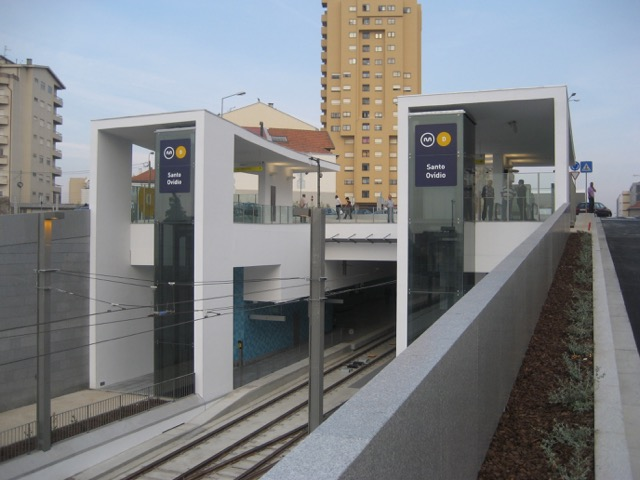
Entrance to the station, with platforms below

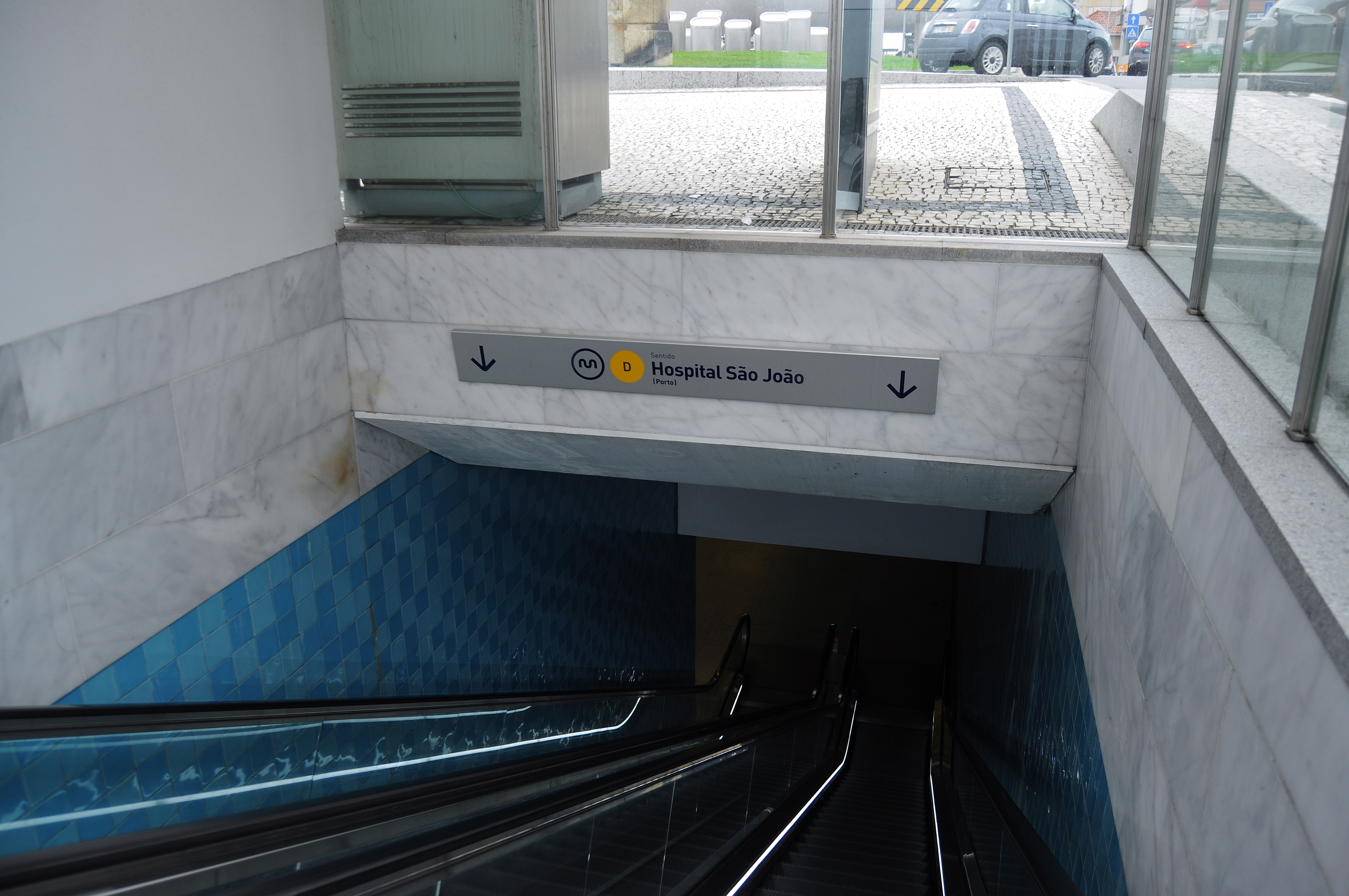
Detail of the station entrance

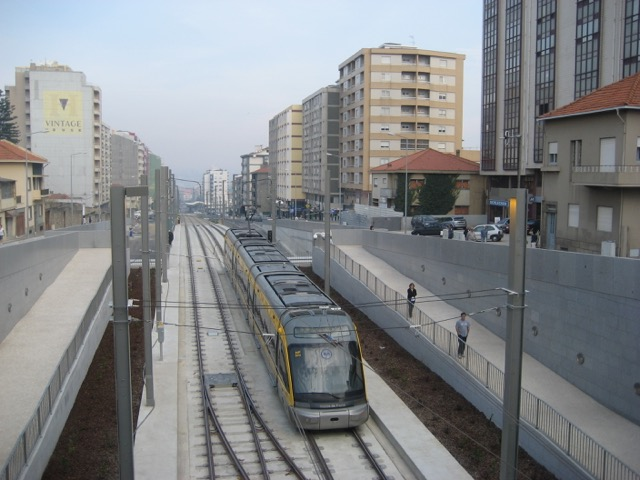
View north from the station down Av da República
