= Chuncheon–Sokcho Line =

Planned railway line in South Korea

- Hangul: 춘천-속초선
- Hanja: 春川束草線
- Revised Romanization: Chuncheon-Sokcho
- McCune–Reischauer: Ch'unch'ŏn-Sokch'o

The Chuncheon-Sokcho Line (Korean: 춘천-속초선) is a planned high-speed rail line between Chuncheon and Sokcho.

== History ==
March 3, 2020: master plan announcement

October 18, 2022: construction start

December 2027: scheduled opening

== Stations ==
Station name			Transfer	Distance in km		Location	
Romanized	Hangul	Hanja	Transfer	Station distance	Total distance	Location	
Chuncheon	춘천	春川	Gyeongchun Line		0.0	Gangwon-do	Chuncheon-si
Hwacheon	화쳔	華川				Gangwon-do	Hwacheon-gun
Yanggu	양구	楊口				Gangwon-do	Yanggu-gun
Inje	인제	麟蹄				Gangwon-do	Inje-gun
Baekdam	백담	百潭				Gangwon-do	Inje-gun
Sokcho	속초	束草	Donghae Line		93.7	Gangwon-do	Sokcho-si
