= SNCF Oxygène =

French train under construction

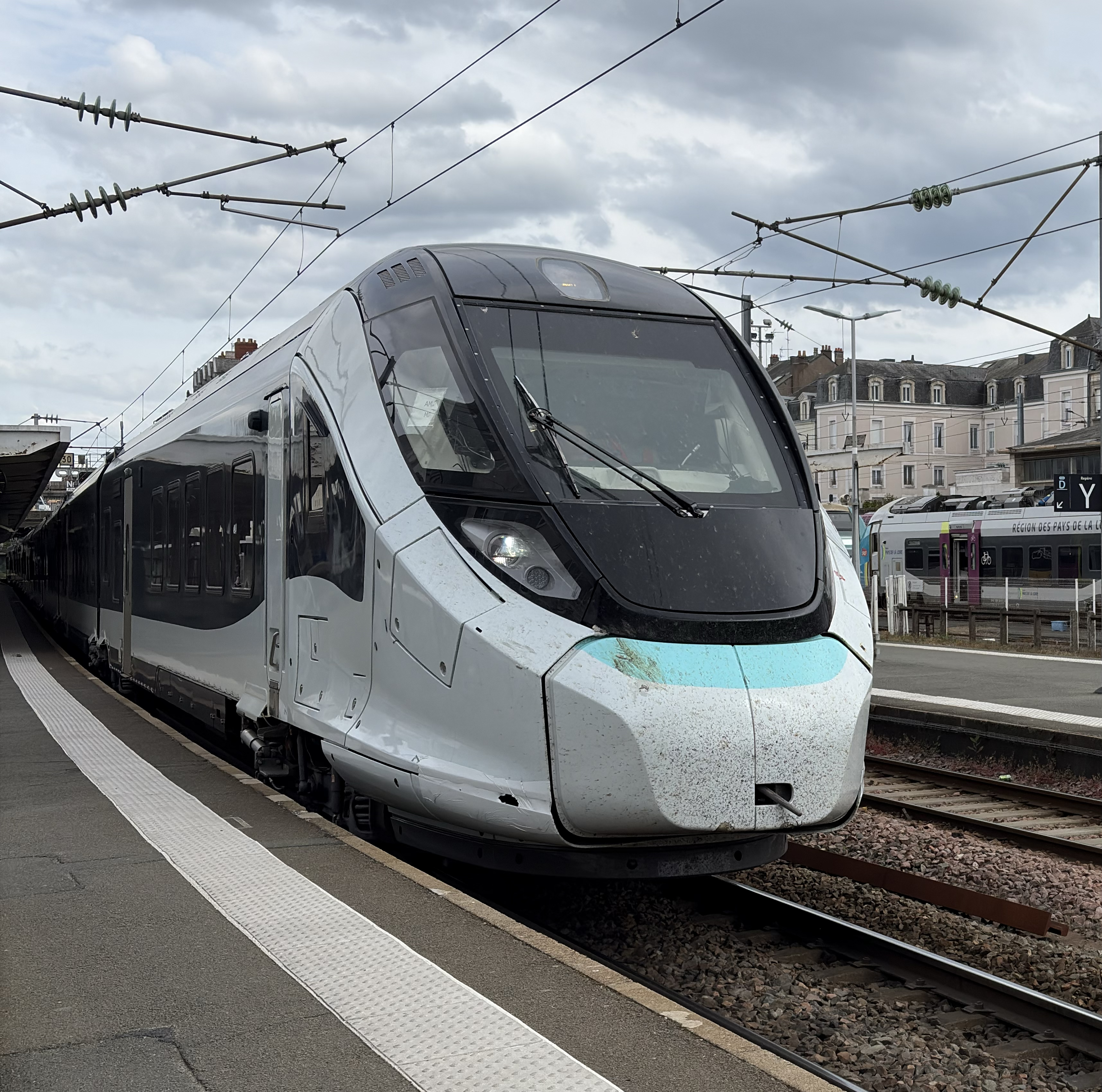
- Pre-production unit at Angers-Saint-Laud station, 2026
- Stock type: Electric multiple unit
- Manufacturer: CAF
- Assembly: Reichshoffen, France; Beasain, Spain
- Number under construction: 50
- Formation: 10 cars
- Capacity: 420 seats (1st class: 103, 2nd class: 317)

Specifications
- Car body construction: Aluminium
- Train length: 188 m (616 ft 10 in)
- Width: 2.86 m (9 ft 5 in)
- Height: 4.26 m (14 ft 0 in)
- Floor height: 630 mm (25 in) (low floor car)
- Wheel diameter: 840–770 mm (33–30 in) (new–worn)
- Maximum speed: 200 km/h (125 mph)
- Weight: 365 t (359 long tons; 402 short tons)
- Traction motors: 8 × 500 kW (670 hp) asynchronous 3-phase AC
- Power output: 4 MW (5,400 hp)
- Gearbox: CAF MIIRA AHD-450-2.571-1
- Gear ratio: 2.571 : 1 (2-stage reduction)
- Electric systems: Overhead line: 25 kV 50 Hz AC; 1,500 V DC
- Current collection: Pantograph
- UIC classification: Bo′(2)′(2)′(2)′(2)′Bo′+Bo′(2)′(2)′(2)′(2)′Bo′
- Safety systems: ETCS, KVB
- Track gauge: 1,435 mm (4 ft 8 1/2 in) standard gauge

The Oxygène Z 26700, previously known as the Confort200 and AMLD (Automotrice de Moyenne et Longue Distance) is a high speed, electric multiple unit, passenger train under construction by CAF, for SNCF for use on their Intercités services. The trains will serve the Paris-Clermont Ferrand, Paris-Orléans-Limoges-Toulouse (POLT) and Bordeaux-Marseilles lines. It is planned for entry into service in summer 2027.

== History ==
In 2010, an agreement was signed between SNCF and the French government to support the Intercités service, troubled with low profitability. In 2012, owing to the potential cost of replacing the Corail rolling stock on Intercités services, refurbishment of TGV Sud-Est sets was considered, for service at a lower speed.

The order, worth €700 million, for 28 trainsets, with options for 75 more (including 20 which could be used on a Bordeaux-Marseille service), was placed in December 2019 and funded by the French government.

The choice of CAF, a Spanish company, over the French Alstom, was controversial among some local elected officials and unions.

It was initially planned to be built at Bagnères-de-Bigorre, France, and Beasain, Spain. CAF later took over Alstom's Reichshoffen site (along with the Coradia Polyvalent platform and Bombardier's Talent 3 platform) in the process of the latter's acquisition of Bombardier Transportation. It was later confirmed the first 8 trainsets will be built at CAF's Beasain plant in Spain, with the rest at their site in Reichshoffen, Alsace, France.

On 6 and 15 December 2022, a full-scale model of the train was unveiled at Brive-la-Gaillarde station and Clermont-Ferrand station respectively.

Testing was started in July 2023 at the Velim test track in the Czech Republic, with tests up to 200 km/h.

In December 2024, a further 22 trains were ordered by SNCF for €400 million for services on the Bordeaux - Marseille main line. These additional trains will be built entirely at CAF's Reichshoffen plant. These trains will enter service from 2028.

Initially, it was scheduled to enter service from 2024. This was however delayed to Q1 2027, due to faults, involving excessive brake pad wear, and vibrations caused by failure of traction motors (since resolved). Traction motors were sent back to Mitsubishi Electric in Japan, for review. Initially slated for February 2026, homologation testing on the French network began in May 2026.

Investment in the trains and the infrastructure includes €715 million for the first batch and €650 million for the second batch, and €100 million for new maintenance facilities in the Paris Region (at Ivry-sur-Seine and Villeneuve-Saint-Georges), Clermont-Ferrand and Brive-la-Gaillarde.

The French government and SNCF are also spending €2.5 billion on renewing the Paris-Clermont Ferrand and Paris-Toulouse main lines. In addition to this, adapting the lines to accommodate the new Oxygène trains is expected to cost €515 million.

The first train was unveiled in SNCF's Villeneuve-Saint-Georges depot on 24 April 2025. The first 2 trains were to be tested from mid-2025, for type approval by December 2026. In May 2026, entry into service was delayed again slightly from Q1 2027 to summer 2027.

== Design ==
The 10-car articulated 188 m train sets will be able to run at a maximum speed of 200 km/h in service. Trains will have WiFi, power outlets and USB ports at all seats. There will 10 numbered bicycle spaces in each train set, in a car at the centre of the train, each with charging points for electric bicycles. In addition to the real time information system, screens will show a live view from the cab.

Each 10-car trainset will be designed to be split in two for easier maintenance. Distributed traction will be provided in the form of asynchronous motors on the end cars and 2 centre cars, with a continuous power rating of 4 MW.

Trains will be fitted to work both 25 kV 50 Hz AC and 1.5kV DC lines. There will be capacity for 420 passengers (equivalent roughly to 7 Corail coaches - 103 in first class, and 317 in second class).

Boarding height will be 630 mm above rail height on low floor cars to allow for better accessibility, in addition to wide gangways.

Trains are equipped with ETCS and KVB, the train protection system used in France.

CAF selected Mitsubishi Electric to supply traction motors for the order in 2022, following delivery of prototype main transformers in 2017, which were used for a Z 2N commuter train and T4 tram-train operating in Paris. The traction systems involve roof-mounted converters and inverters with natural air cooling.

== Service ==
The new trains will allow for the addition of another return service each day on the routes planned. Time savings of 15 minutes from the journey time to the Paris – Clermont-Ferrand and Paris – Limoges service are expected, with journey times of 3h15min and 2h51min respectively.
