= Warszawa Ulrychów railway station =

Future railway station in Warsaw

Warszawa Ulrychów Warsaw Ulrychów

General information
- Location: Ulrychów, Bemowo/Wola, Warsaw; Poland
- Coordinates: 52°14′26.1″N 20°55′30.6″E
- Owner: PKP Polish Railway Lines
- Line: Warsaw Orbital Railway
- Platforms: 2
- Train operators: PKP Intercity (planned)
- Connections: Ulrychów

History
- Opening: 17 January 2027
Location
- Location within Poland

Warszawa Ulrychów is a Polish railway station under construction in the Ulrychów neighbourhood of western Warsaw. It will be situated underneath Górczewska Street, on the borders of the Bemowo and Wola districts.

The station is designed to ease diverted PKP Intercity trains from Warszawa Gdańska during the planned reconstruction of Warszawa Wschodnia. At least 128 services are excepted to call at Ulrychów daily. Half of the platforms' lengths are temporary and are planned to be removed after the diversions end. In the longer term, Ulrychów is intended to serve regional train services.

Warszawa Ulrychów is being built at the northern end of the pre-existing Warszawa Jelonki goods yard.

== Background ==
The reconstruction of Warszawa Wschodnia, scheduled to begin on 17 January 2027, will require numerous trains to be diverted. Ulrychów is being built to serve diverted PKP Intercity trains, providing a through station for trains heading between Warszawa Gdańska.

== History ==
On 24 June 2026, PKP Polish Railway Lines (PLK) signed a contract valued 41 million PLN for the construction of Warszawa Ulrychów railway station. The initial opening date was scheduled for December, although works would continue until the second half of 2027. Construction began on 24 August, which included the reconstruction of junctions at Jelonki.

On 21 October, the opening date of the station was delayed to 17 January 2027, with the extensive reconstruction of Warszawa Wschodnia which would begin at the same time, in conjunction with train diversions. PLK expects around 128 PKP Intercity trains (of all categories) to call at Ulrychów every day.

== Station ==
Warszawa Ulrychów will be a railway halt on the Warsaw Orbital Railway. The station's platforms will be formed in a staggered layout, situated on either side of the above Górczewska Street viaduct. Platform 1 will be 400 m (1,300 ft) long whilst platform 2 will be 450 m (1,480 ft) long. Both platforms have a 200 m (660 ft) temporary section. In addition, Ulrychów will be fully accessible featuring lifts and stairs from the viaduct and additional street-level entrances.

== Connections ==
Ulrychów of the Warsaw Metro's M2 line is located approximately 300 m (980 ft) on street-level from the station.

== Train services ==
Warszawa Ulrychów will be a through station for international PKP Intercity trains between Warszawa Gdańska and for cities such as Munich, Prague, Vienna, and Budapest.
