= Aeroporto station (Porto Metro) =

Light rail station on the Porto Metro serving Porto Airport in Portugal

Aeroporto
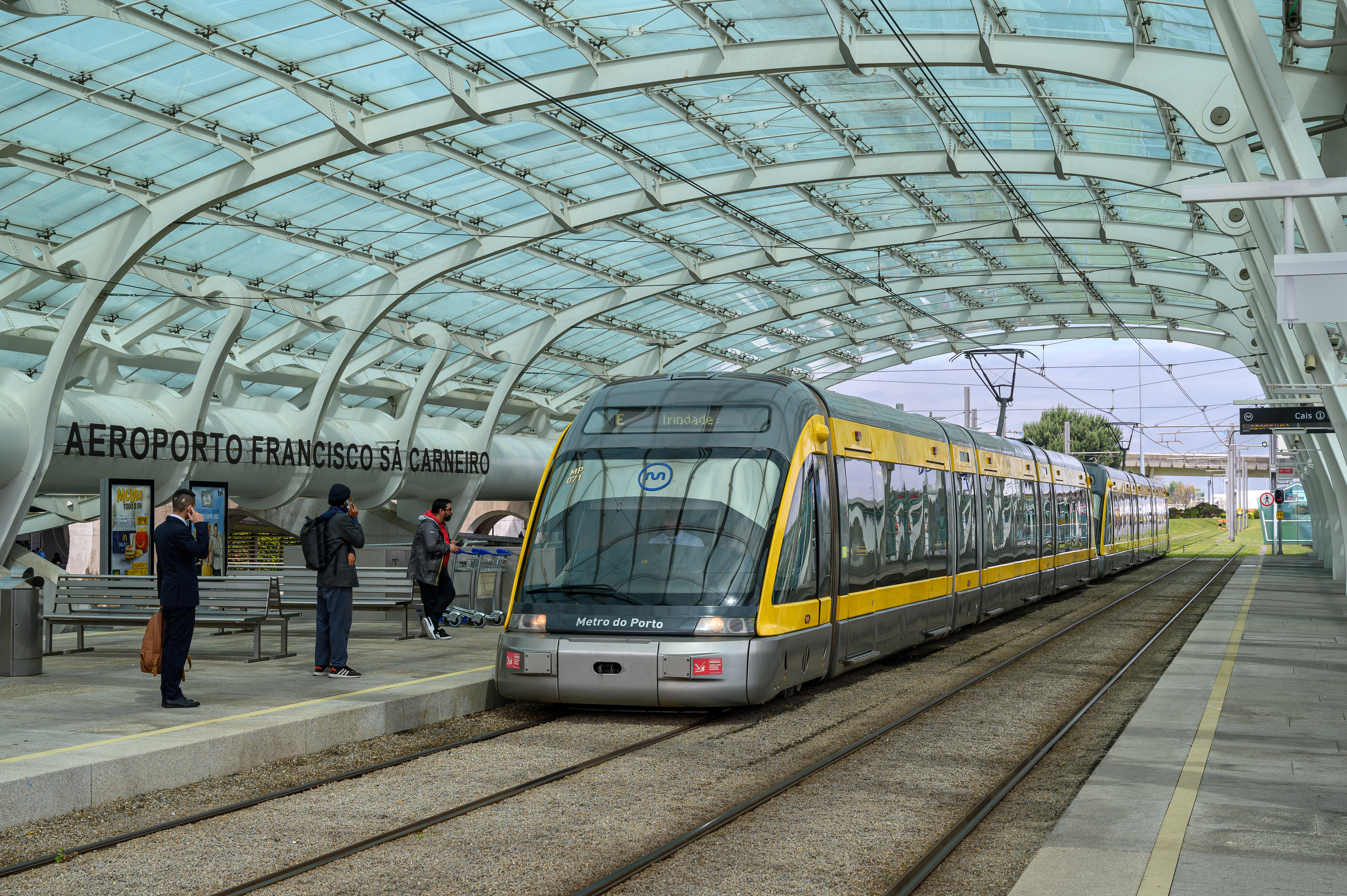
- Tram waiting to depart from the airport station

General information
- Location: Maia; Portugal
- Coordinates: 41°14′14″N 8°40′11″W
- System: Porto Metro station
- Platforms: 2 (1 side platform; 1 island platform)
- Tracks: 3

Construction
- Structure type: At grade
- Accessible: Yes

Services
Preceding station	Porto Metro	Following station
Terminus	Line E	Botica towards Trindade or Estádio do Dragão
Location

Aeroporto is a light rail station on the Porto Metro system in the municipality of Maia, Portugal. It was built to serve Porto Airport, and is situated immediately outside the main terminal of that airport. The station is the terminus of line E of the Metro, which provides a direct connection to the centre of the city of Porto.

Porto Metro line E, including Aeroporto station, opened on 27 May 2006. Trains run every 15 minutes as far as Trindade, in the centre of the city, with some continuing to Estádio do Dragão.

The station has an overall roof, and the platforms are accessed by stairs and lifts from a lower-level concourse, which in turn is directly accessible from the terminal building. Arriving trains stop at a single side platform to set down passengers before proceeding to a reversal siding beyond the station to reverse. From here they stop at either side of an island platform to pick up passengers. The next station after departure is Botica.
