= Krasnoyarsk Metrotram =

Rapid transit system under construction in Krasnoyarsk, Russia

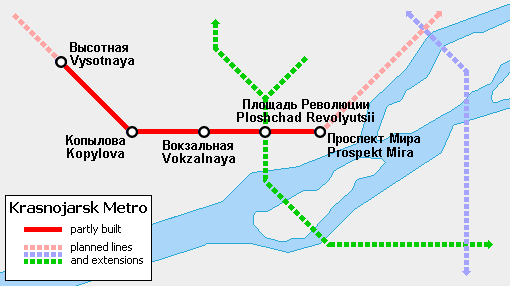
Map of the future Metro

Krasnoyarsk Metrotram is a future light rail (metrotram) system in the city of Krasnoyarsk, Russia. Construction began at a slow pace in the late 1990s, it is planned to be completed by 2027.

== History ==
=== Preparation and initial stages of construction ===
In 1983, at a meeting of the Politburo of the CPSU Central Committee, a decision was made to build a subway in Krasnoyarsk. Engineering and technical surveys were carried out by the KrasTISIZ KrasTISIZ trust. In 1989, the feasibility study of the first metro line in the city of Krasnoyarsk by the Institute "Kharkovmetroproekt" was done.

Construction itself – the first bucket of ground was taken out – began on October 17, 1995. Work on shaft No. 5 (Ploschad Revolyutsii station) began on January 30, 1996. By 2003, the shaft was driven to the design depth of 71.2 meters, the entire complex of temporary buildings and structures was erected on the surface, necessary for driving near-shaft workings and ferry tunnels. At the section of the shaft, mining and tunneling works were carried out to construct a pumping chamber and a bypass adit. In July 2003, a plant equipped with an automatic carousel line for the production of high-precision reinforced concrete blocks for lining tunnels was put into operation in Krasnoyarsk.The equipment was supplied by the French company CBE. The plant produces up to 11 blocks per shift. Reinforced concrete blocks were supplied for the construction of the subways of Krasnoyarsk, Novosibirsk, Chelyabinsk. By September 2007, more than 2,100 meters of direct running tunnels had been completed, not counting the approach workings and shafts. By the time of the cessation of active work in 2009, in addition to tunneling, the construction of the Vysotnaya stations was underway (by the open method – construction of a pit, platform site facilities, lobbies, other elements of the station) and "Vokzalnaya" (deep); maintenance work was carried out at the mine workings of the Ploschad Revolyutsii station – lighting, ventilation, drainage, as well as supervision and control; work on the design of the locomotive depot and stations included in the start-up complex.

=== Period of conservation and uncertainty ===
In 2009, it was decided to terminate the construction of the station "Revolution Square" – the mine workings should be mothballed until the first section of three stations is put into operation, the technical building should be dismantled, the mine should be covered with sand, the construction site should be temporarily liquidated. In 2010, the municipal institution "Administration for the construction of the Krasnoyarsk Metro" was liquidated. In January 2012, Governor Kuznetsov announced the continuation of the construction of the metro and the reactivation of mine workings. In May 2013, the decision was again made to mothball all constructed mine workings for an indefinite period. The order of the city administration for conservation is posted on the public procurement portal. In early 2015, the Governor of the Krasnoyarsk Territory V.A.Tolokonsky, due to the high cost, ordered to suspend the construction of the metro until 2020, focusing on the construction of ground objects.

In March 2018, President of the Russian Federation Vladimir Putin signed a number of instructions following his February visit to Krasnoyarsk; one of them concerned the financing of the construction of the Krasnoyarsk metro. On April 26, 2019, the Governor of the Krasnoyarsk Krai, Alexander Uss, announced that the construction of the metro would be prepared for the summer of 2020. According to the bill "On the development of the subway in Krasnoyarsk", construction is scheduled to start in 2019, and completion in 2023. In August 2020, the chairman of the board of directors of the Krasnoyarsk Trust for Engineering and Construction Surveys, which is developing a metro construction project, Oleg Mitvol announced that the first construction work will begin no earlier than the end of 2021. It is supposed to use shortened four-car trains with unmanned vehicles. If the metro network is fully developed, this annual figure could reach 260 million passengers. In the end of 2021, it is known that the first line will have six stations (from Vysotnaya to Leninskaya). The length will be 9.76 km. Construction was expected to start in summer 2022. Opening was expected in 2026.

In 2022 Oleg Mitvol was arrested on suspicion of theft of more than 900 million roubles during the construction of the metro in Krasnoyarsk. In summer 2022, a decision was made to complete the Krasnoyarsk metro tunnels and modernise the above-ground sections for the launch of the high-speed tramway. On 10 August 2022, the regional government signed contracts for a set of design, construction and installation works to create a high-speed underground light rail line in Krasnoyarsk. Mosproject-3 was selected as the contractor. They proposed to reduce the depth of the tunnels to twelve metres, to abandon deep-buried stations, and to locate the engineering building and the maintenance building in the depot. The first construction works started in May 2023 on the Molokova Street. Tunnel boring is expected to start in 2024.

== System ==
Construction began on the system in 1995. However, after three years of work and 500 meters of tunneling, a lack of funds slowed construction considerably. By 2004, new tunneling equipment had been purchased, but another funding cut stopped progress again.

By 2005, the Federal Government stepped in to help the project along. 144 million rubles were allocated by Moscow which would help advance the tunnels another 250 meters. 2006 brought another 230 million rubles to finish the remaining 400 meters between the first two stations and start 100 meters towards the third station.
