= Swargate metro station =

Pune Metro's Purple Line metro station

Swargate
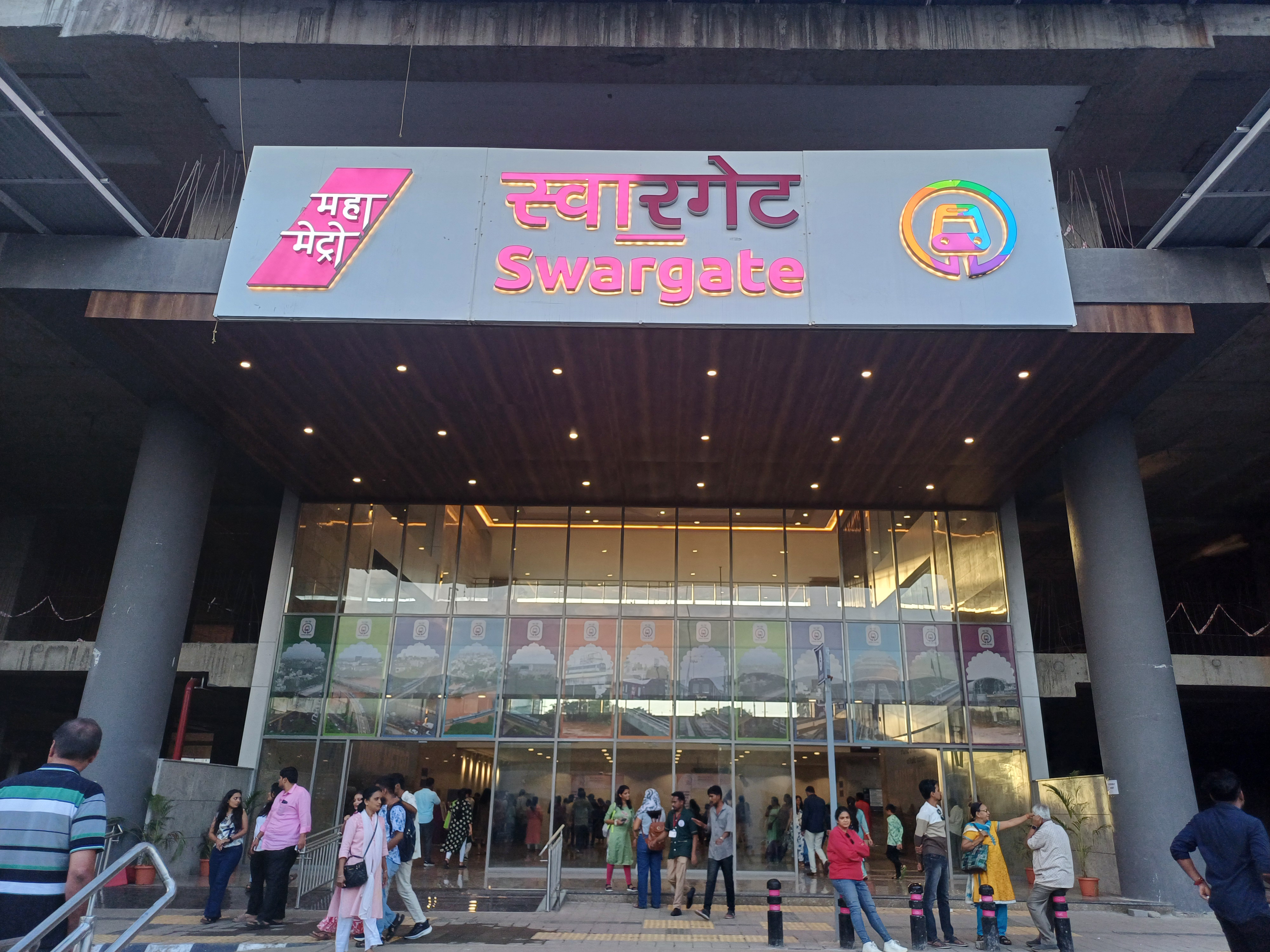

General information
- Location: Swargate, Pune, Maharashtra 411030
- Coordinates: 18°29′59″N 73°51′28″E
- System: Pune Metro station
- Owner: Maharashtra Metro Rail Corporation Limited (Maha Metro)
- Operator: Pune Metro
- Line: Purple Line
- Platforms: Island platform Platform-1 → Train Terminates Here; Platform-2 → PCMC Bhavan
- Tracks: 2

Construction
- Structure type: Underground, Double track
- Platform levels: 2
- Accessible: Yes

Other information
- Station code: SGT

History
- Opened: 29 September 2024; 22 months ago
- Electrified: 25 kV 50 Hz AC overhead catenary

Services
| Preceding station | Pune Metro | Following station |
|---|---|---|
| Mahatma Phule Mandai towards PCMC Bhavan | Purple Line | Terminus |
Route map
Location

Swargate is an underground metro station serving as the southern terminal of the Purple Line of Pune Metro. It was opened on 29 September 2024 as the final extension of Pune Metro Phase I. It is further being developed as a multimodal transport hub, which will provide seamless integration of metro services with the PMPML and MSRTC Swargate bus stations. Additionally, retail and commercial establishments will be built over the station on a public–private partnership model.

When the operations were started here, commuters faced issues while buying online tickets at the underground station due to weak network signals. Bharti Airtel became the first operator to upgrade the sites along the 17.4km long PCMC–Swargate route with additional deployment of in-building solutions along the 6km long underground stretch.

The extension of the Purple Line from Swargate to Katraj was approved by the Government of India on 16 August 2024. Named as Line–1B, this section will include three underground stations on a 5.46km long route. The official ground breaking ceremony took place on 29 September 2024 and is expected to be completed by February 2029.

== Station layout ==
| G | Street level | Exit/ Entrance |
| M | Mezzanine | Fare control, station agent, Ticket/token, shops |
| P | Platform 1 Southbound | Towards → Train Terminates Here |
| P | Island platform | Doors will open on the right |
| P | Platform 2 Westbound | Towards ← PCMC Bhavan; Next Station: Mahatma Phule Mandai |

== See also ==
- Pune
- Maharashtra
- Rapid Transit in India
