= PCMC Bhavan metro station =

Pune Metro's Purple Line terminal metro station in Pimpri-Chinchwad, India

PCMC Bhavan
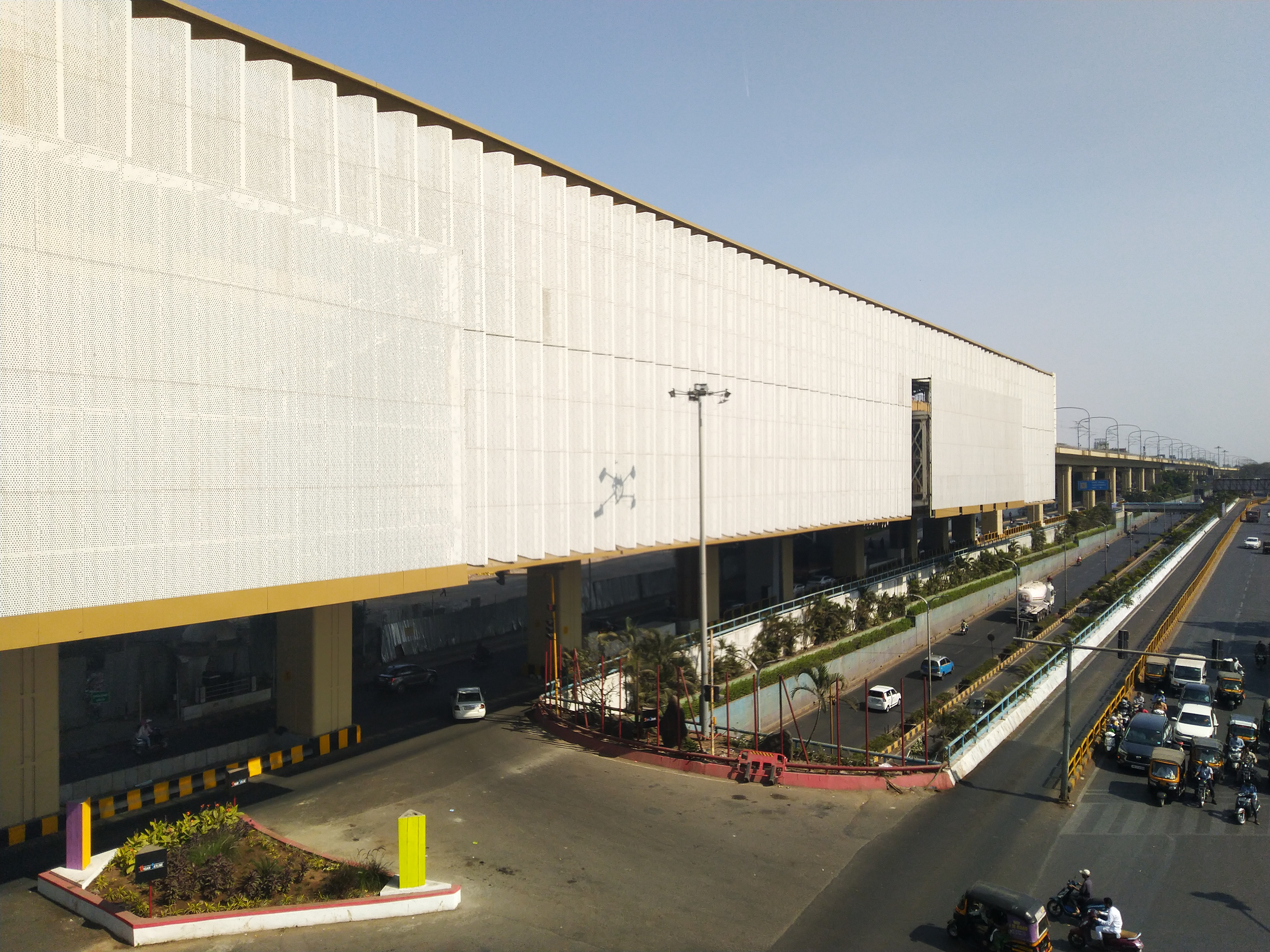

General information
- Location: Morewadi, Pimpri Colony, Pimpri Chinchwad, Maharashtra 411018
- Coordinates: 18°37′46″N 73°48′12″E
- System: Pune Metro station
- Owner: Maharashtra Metro Rail Corporation Limited (Maha Metro)
- Operator: Pune Metro
- Line: Purple Line
- Platforms: 2 Side platform

Construction
- Structure type: Elevated, Double track
- Accessible: Yes

Other information
- Station code: PIM

History
- Opened: 6 March 2022; 4 years ago

Passengers
- Sept 2024: ▲5,85,753

Services
Preceding station	Pune Metro	Following station
Terminus	Purple Line	Sant Tukaram Nagar towards Swargate
Route map
Location

PCMC Bhavan is an elevated metro station serving as the northern terminal of Purple Line of Pune Metro in Pimpri Chinchwad, India. The station was opened on 6 March 2022 as an inauguration of Pune Metro. From March 2022 to July 2023, the Purple Line operated between PCMC Bhavan and Phugewadi, but from 1 August 2023 the section between Phugewadi and District Court Pune metro station came into use, so trains ran from PCMC Bhavan to Civil Court. On 29 September 2024, the launch of Pune Metro Phase I was completed and the Purple Line was fully operational from PCMC to Swargate. An extension has been planned which will move PCMC station's terminal status and extend the line to Nigdi.

== Station layout ==
G	Street level	Exit/Entrance
L1	Mezzanine	Fare control, station agent, Metro Card vending machines, crossover, food and beverage stalls.
L2	Side platform | Doors will open on the left
L2	Platform 1 Southbound	Towards → Swargate; Next Station: Sant Tukaram Nagar
L2	Platform 2 Northbound	Towards ← Train Terminates Here
L2	Side platform | Doors will open on the left
L2

== Gallery ==
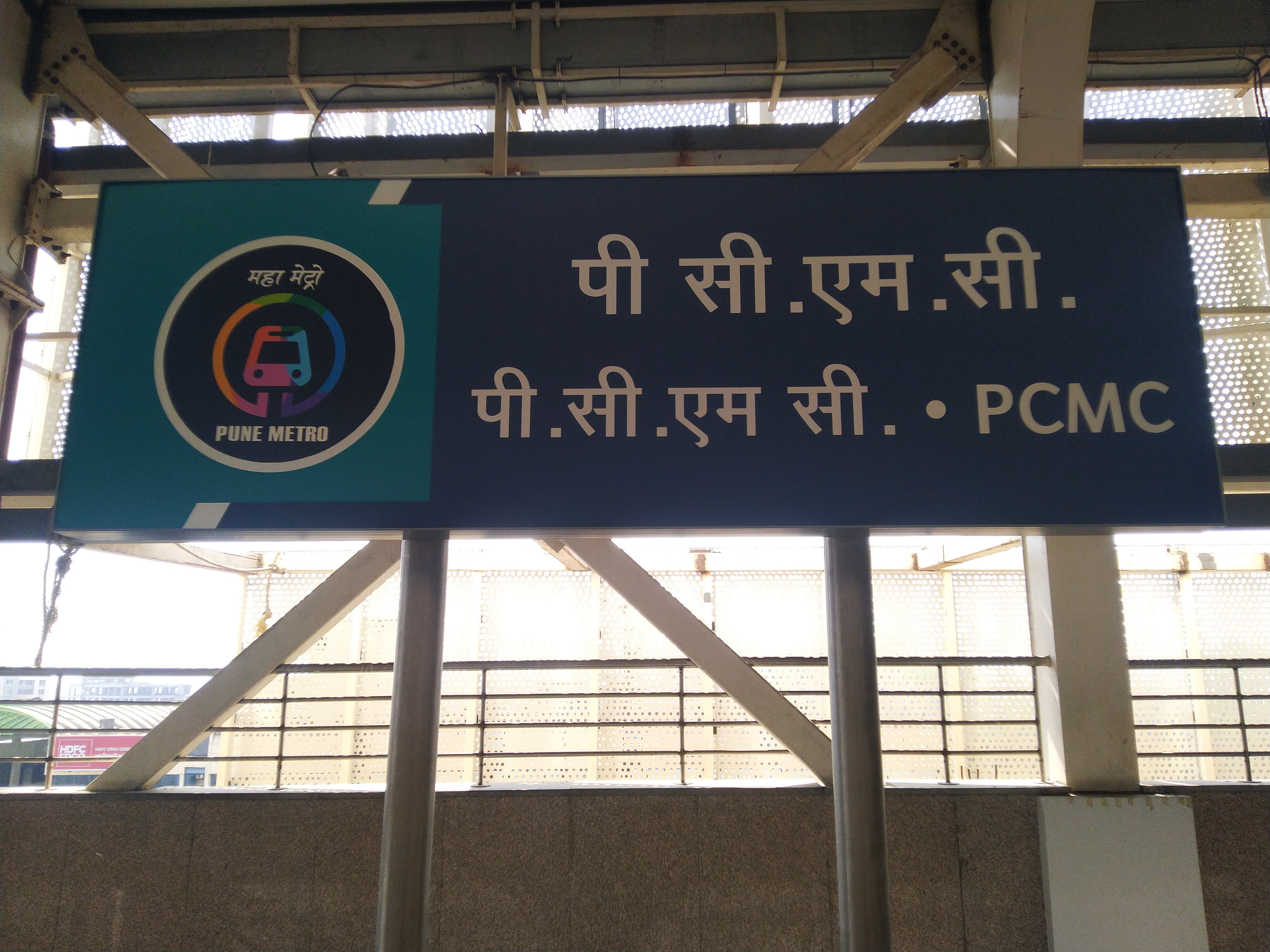
Nameboard of PCMC Bhavan metro station.jpg.

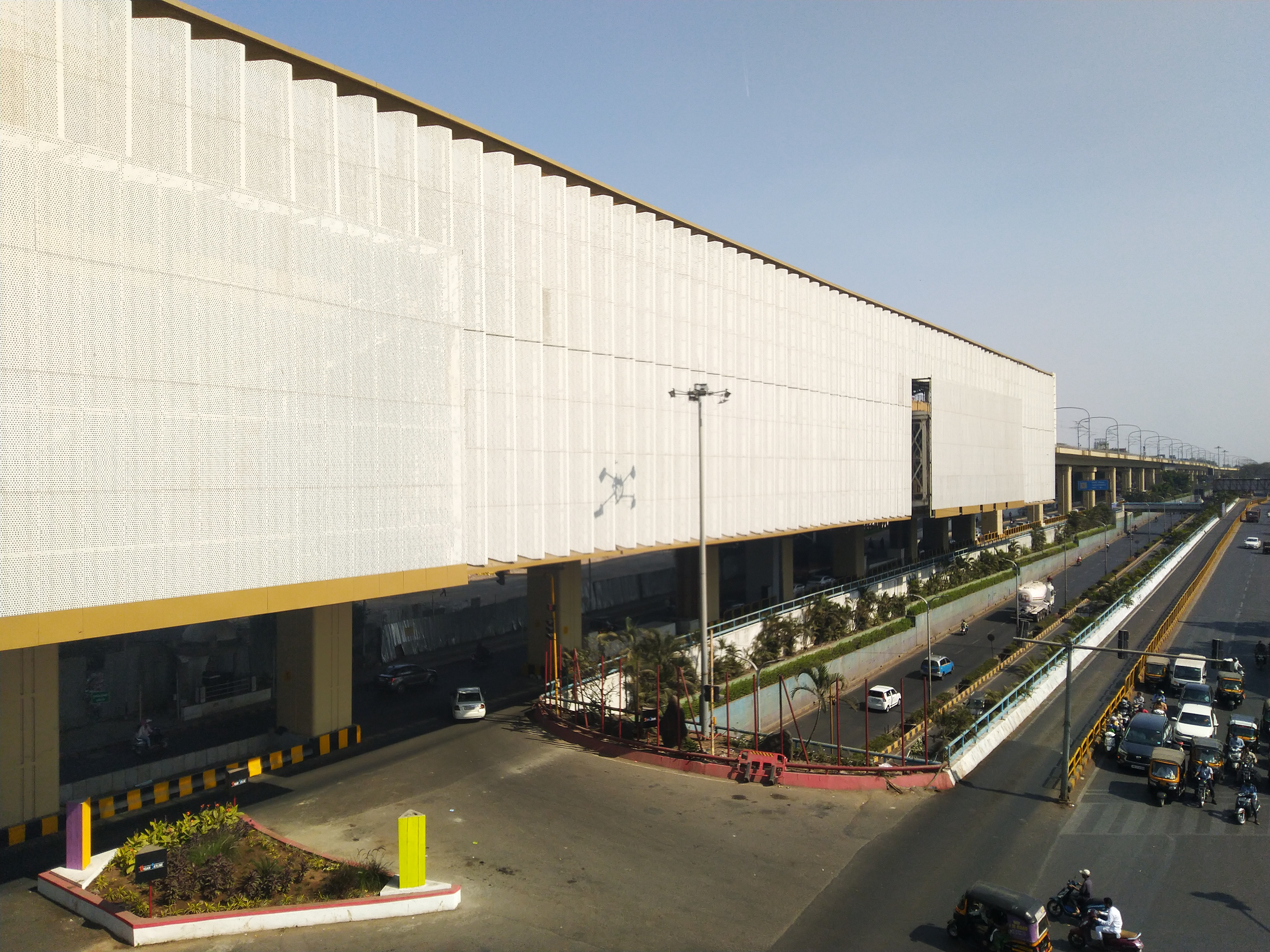
Facade of PCMC Bhavan metro station

== See also ==
- Pune
- Maharashtra
- Rapid Transit in India
