= Senhora da Hora station =

Light rail, and former railway, station in Porto, Portugal

Senhora da Hora
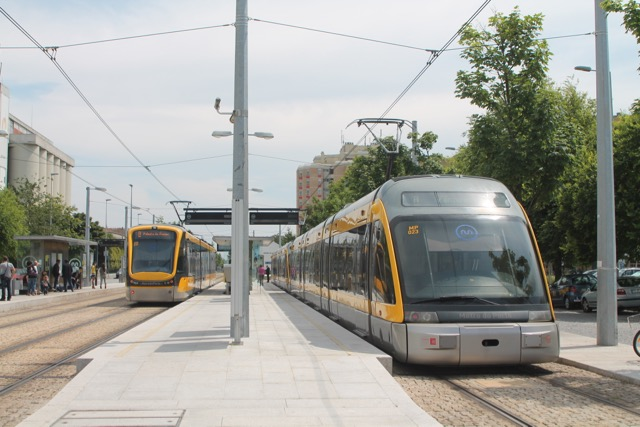
- The station's platforms, showing the layout with a side platform and an island platform flanking three tracks

General information
- Location: Matosinhos; Portugal
- Coordinates: 41°11′17.14″N 8°39′16.08″W
- System: Porto Metro station
- Platforms: 1 side platform and 1 island platform
- Tracks: 3

Construction
- Structure type: At Grade
- Accessible: Yes

Key dates
- 1875: Opened
- 2001: Closed
- 7 December 2002: Reopened

Services
Preceding station	Porto Metro	Following station
Vasco da Gama towards Senhor de Matosinhos	Line A	Sete Bicas towards Estádio do Dragão
Fonte do Cuco towards Póvoa de Varzim	Line B	Sete Bicas towards Estádio do Dragão
Pedras Rubras towards Póvoa de Varzim	Line Bx	Sete Bicas towards Estádio do Dragão
Fonte do Cuco towards ISMAI	Line C	Sete Bicas towards Campanhã
Fonte do Cuco towards Aeroporto	Line E	Sete Bicas towards Trindade or Estádio do Dragão
Terminus	Line F	Sete Bicas towards Fânzeres
Location

Senhora da Hora is a light rail station on the Porto Metro system, and a former railway station on the Porto to Póvoa and Famalicão line. It is located in the centre of Av. Fabril do Norte in the municipality of Matosinhos in Portugal. It was originally opened in 1875, closed in 2001, and reopened as a Metro station in 2002.

== History ==
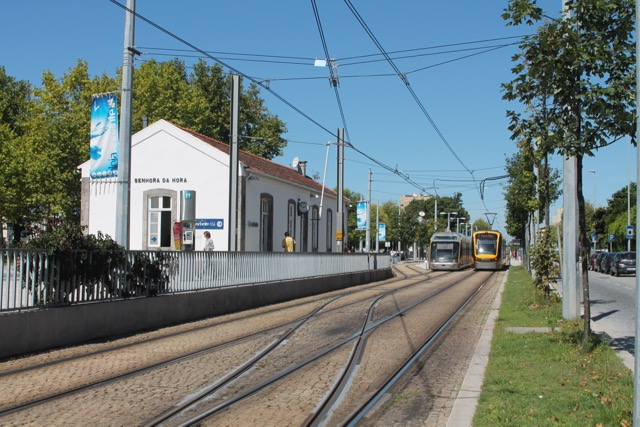
The new station seen from the south, with the old station building to the left

The original railway station was built on the former narrow gauge Porto to Póvoa and Famalicão line. This station was opened on 1 October 1875 on the line between Porto-Boavista and Póvoa de Varzim stations, originally built to a gauge of 900 mm (2 ft 11 7/16 in). The line was extended, in stages, beyond Póvoa de Varzim, reaching its ultimate terminal at Famalicão on 12 June 1881.

In 1884, the contractors building the breakwaters at the Port of Leixões, built a narrow gauge railway from the quarries at São Gens to the port area, passing through Senhora da Hora station at right angles to the existing line. After the completion of the port works in 1893, this line was adapted for the transport of passengers and goods, with connections to the existing line allowing direct services to be operated between Porto-Boavista and the port. This line became known as the Matosinhos branch.

In 1927 the railway lines through the station were re-gauged from 900mm to 1,000 mm (3 ft 3 3/8 in), and a branch was built from some 700 metres (2,300 ft) north of Senhora da Hora to connect with the pre-existing Guimarães line at Trofa, thus allowing through trains to run between Guimarães and Porto-Boavista. In 1938 the line was extended from Porto-Boavista station to Porto-Trindade station, nearer the centre of Porto.

The old narrow gauge station closed in 2001, as part of the preparations for the creation of the Porto Metro, which uses much of the track-bed of the old line. During these works, the old junction with the Matosinhos branch in the station was removed, and the Metro line A to Matosinhos adopted a new alingnment with a junction some 250 metres (820 ft) north of the station. The old station building still stands, just to the south of the current station.

The new station was inaugurated on 7 December 2002 and commercial services started on 1 January 2003. This section was initially served by the initial line A operating between terminals at Trindade and Senhor de Matosinhos stations. The line was extended eastwards from Trinidade to Estádio do Dragão on 5 June 2004. Using the same tracks, line B started operation on 13 March 2005, line C on 30 July 2005, line E on 27 May 2006, and line F on 2 January 2011.

== Services ==
Senhora da Hora is a through station on lines A, B, C and E, and is the north-western terminus for trains on line F. These lines run as one line within the metropolitan area, and the next station to the south-east is Sete Bicas. Like other stations in the common section of lines A, B, C, E and F, Senhora da Hora sees a very frequent service, with up to 21 trains per hour in both directions.

To the north of Senhora da Hora station there is a junction, where line A diverges, whilst line B splits into a basic line B that stops at all stations, and the express Bx that only stops at principal stations. The next station to the north on line A is Vasco da Gama, on line Bx it is Pedras Rubras, whilst on the other lines it is Fonte do Cuco.

Senhora da Hora station is located at street level, in the centre of Av. Fabril do Norte. It has three through tracks served by a side platform and an island platform, accessed directly from the street.
