= Sete Bicas station =

Light rail station in Porto, Portugal

Sete Bicas
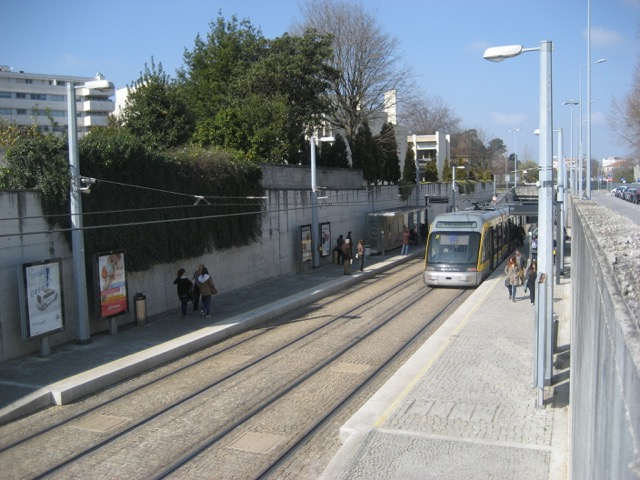
- The station's platforms

General information
- Location: Matosinhos; Portugal
- Coordinates: 41°10′57″N 8°39′08″W
- System: Porto Metro station
- Platforms: 2 side platforms
- Tracks: 2

Construction
- Structure type: Below street level
- Accessible: Yes

History
- Opened: 7 December 2002

Services
Preceding station	Porto Metro	Following station
Senhora da Hora towards Senhor de Matosinhos	Line A	Viso towards Estádio do Dragão
Senhora da Hora towards Póvoa de Varzim	Line B	Viso towards Estádio do Dragão
Senhora da Hora towards Póvoa de Varzim	Line Bx	Viso towards Estádio do Dragão
Senhora da Hora towards ISMAI	Line C	Viso towards Campanhã
Senhora da Hora towards Aeroporto	Line E	Viso towards Trindade or Estádio do Dragão
Senhora da Hora Terminus	Line F	Viso towards Fânzeres
Location

Sete Bicas is a light rail station on the Porto Metro system in the municipality of Matosinhos, Portugal. It was opened in 2002 and serves the nearby NorteShopping centre.

== History ==
The station was built in the corridor of the former 1,000 mm (3 ft 3 3/8 in) gauge Porto to Póvoa and Famalicão railway line that operated into the terminals of Porto-Boavista (until 1938) and Porto-Trindade (from 1938). The lines were closed in 2001 to enable the construction of the Metro.

The new station was inaugurated on 7 December 2002 and commercial services started on 1 January 2003. This section was initially served by the initial line A operating between terminals at Trindade and Senhor de Matosinhos. The line was extended eastwards from Trinidade to Estádio do Dragão on 5 June 2004. Using the same tracks, line B started operation on 13 March 2005, line C on 30 July 2005, line E on 27 May 2006, and line F on 2 January 2011.

== Services ==
Sete Bicas is a through station on lines A, B, C, E and F, which run as one line within the metropolitan area. The next station to the south-east is Viso, whilst Senhora da Hora station lies to the north-west. Like other stations in the common section of lines A, B, C, E and F, Senhora da Hora sees a very frequent service, with up to 21 trains per hour in both directions.

Sete Bicas station is located in an open cutting below street level, to the side of the Rua Fonte das Sete Bicas. It has two through tracks served by two side platforms. Access is by ramp from the adjoining streets.
