= Pedro Hispano station =

Light rail station in Matosinhos, Portugal

Pedro Hispano
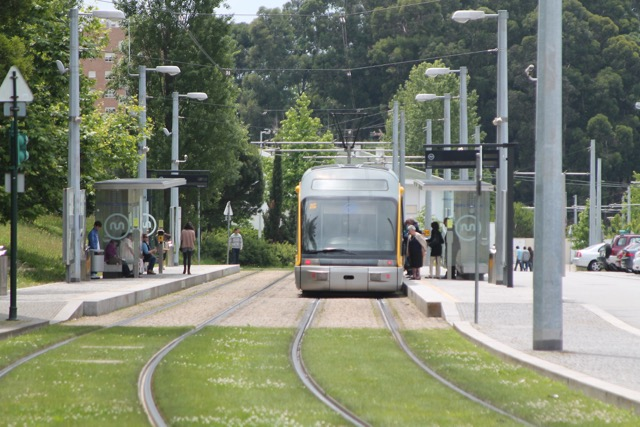
- Track and platforms

General information
- Location: Matosinhos; Portugal
- Coordinates: 41°10′49.55″N 8°39′58.50″W
- System: Porto Metro station
- Platforms: 2 side platforms
- Tracks: 2

Construction
- Structure type: At grade
- Accessible: Yes

History
- Opened: 7 December 2002

Services
Preceding station	Porto Metro	Following station
Parque Real towards Senhor de Matosinhos	Line A	Estádio do Mar towards Estádio do Dragão
Location

Pedro Hispano is a light rail station on the Porto Metro system in the municipality of Matosinhos, Portugal. The station is on Line A of the Metro, which provides a direct connection to the centre of the city of Porto. It is situated in front of the Pedro Hispano Hospital and was opened in 2002.

== History ==
In 1884, the contractors building the breakwaters at the Port of Leixões, built a narrow gauge railway from the quarries at São Gens to the port area. After the completion of the port works in 1893, this line was adapted for the transport of passengers and goods, with connections to the existing Porto to Póvoa and Famalicão narrow gauge line, allowing direct services to be operated between Porto-Boavista station and the port. This line became known as the Matosinhos branch.

The old narrow gauge lines closed in 2001, as part of the preparations for the creation of the Porto Metro, which elsewhere uses much of the track-bed of these lines. Only a short stretch of the Matosinhos branch was reused in this way, but this stretch does include Pedro Hispano station. To the west of the station, where the metro follows the Avenida Villagarcia de Arosa, the old line ran further south, on the Rua Real de Cima. To the east, the metro follows the old line as far as Estádio do Mar. The new station was on the first section of the Porto Metro to open and was inaugurated on 7 December 2002, with commercial services starting on 1 January 2003.

== Services ==
Pedro Hispano is a through station on Line A. The next station to the west is Parque Real. To the east, the next station is Estádio do Mar, with trains passing through an underpass under the A28 motorway between the two. The platforms are at street level, with two through tracks served by two side platforms accessible directly from the street. There are four or five trains per hour in each direction.
