= Póvoa de Varzim station =

Light rail, and former railway, station in Póvoa de Varzim, Portugal

Póvoa de Varzim
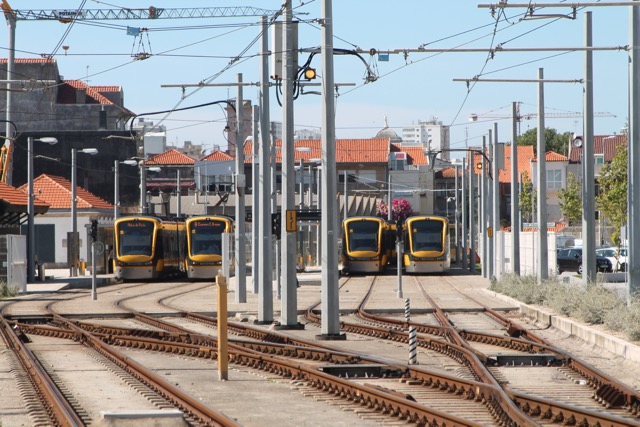
- The Porto Metro terminus. At the left is the old station building of the former narrow gauge railway.

General information
- Location: Povoa de Varzim; Portugal
- Coordinates: 41°22′40.6″N 8°45′29.95″W
- System: Porto Metro station
- Platforms: 1 side platform, 1 island platform
- Tracks: 4

Construction
- Structure type: At Grade
- Accessible: Yes

Key dates
- 1 October 1875: Opened
- 24 February 2002: Closed
- 18 March 2006: Reopened

Services
Preceding station	Porto Metro	Following station
Terminus	Line B	São Brás towards Estádio do Dragão
Terminus	Line Bx	Portas Fronhas towards Estádio do Dragão
Location

Póvoa de Varzim is a light rail station on the Porto Metro system, and a former railway station on the Porto to Póvoa and Famalicão line. It is located in the municipality of Póvoa de Varzim, Portugal. Today the station is the terminus of line B of the Metro, which provides a direct connection to the centre of the city of Porto. It was originally opened in 1875, closed in 2002, and reopened as a Metro station in 2006.

== History ==
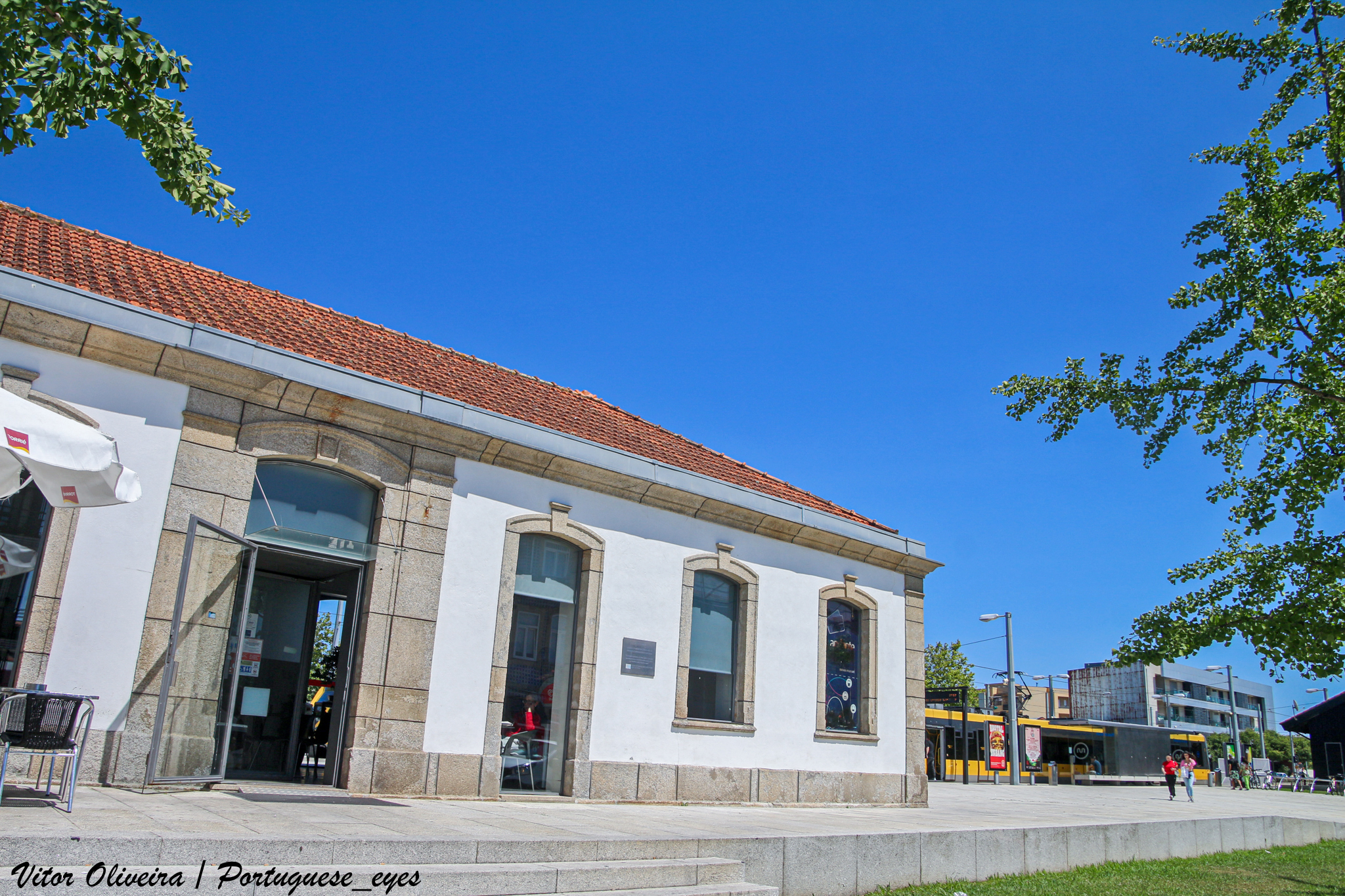
The original station building and platforms seen from the street

The original railway station was built on the former narrow gauge Porto to Póvoa and Famalicão line. This station was opened on 1 October 1875 as the northern terminus of the line from Porto-Boavista station, originally built to a gauge of 900 mm (2 ft 11 7/16 in). The line was extended, in stages, beyond Póvoa de Varzim, reaching its ultimate terminal at Famalicão on 12 June 1881.

In 1927 the railway line was re-gauged from 900mm to 1,000 mm (3 ft 3 3/8 in), and in 1938 it was extended from Porto-Boavista station to Porto-Trindade station, nearer the centre of Porto. In the same time period, a plan was drawn up to modify Póvoa de Varzim station, in order to accommodate both a connection to the town's fishing port, and a future extension of the Póvoa Line to Fão. However, these works never began.

In 1995 the line to Famalicão was abandoned, returning Póvoa de Varzim to its status as a terminal. The old narrow gauge station closed on 24 February 2002, as part of the preparations for the creation of the Porto Metro, which uses much of the track-bed of the old line.

The new Porto Metro station was opened on 18 March 2006 as the terminus of the extension of line B from Pedras Rubras.

== Services ==
Póvoa de Varzim is the terminus of line B but, because of its distance from central Porto, two different services operate over the line. The basic line B service stops at all stations between Póvoa de Varzim and Senhora da Hora, whilst the express Bx service stops only at principal stations. Both services observe all stops within the metropolitan area between Senhora da Hora and Estádio do Dragão. The next station after departure is São Brás for the B, and Portas Fronhas for the Bx.

On weekdays during the day, both services provide two trains per hour in both directions, thus providing four trains per hour in both directions between Póvoa de Varzim and Porto. At weekends and in the evenings only the basic service runs and provides two or three trains per hour in both directions. The basic service takes just over an hour between Póvoa de Varzim and Estádio do Dragão, with the express service saving some 10 minutes.

The platforms are at ground level, with three terminal tracks served by a side platform and an island platform, and a further storage track unserved by a platform. There is level access is from Rua Almirante Reis. The original station building of the old narrow gauge line still exists.
