= Class 9600 =

Class 9600 may refer to:

- CP Class 9600, diesel multiple units
- JNR Class 9600, 2-8-0 steam locomotives
