= Câmara de Matosinhos station =

Light rail station in Matosinhos, Portugal

Câmara de Matosinhos
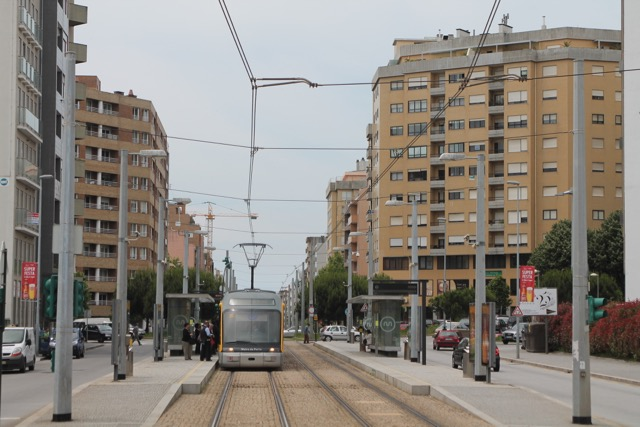
- Track and platforms

General information
- Location: Matosinhos; Portugal
- Coordinates: 41°10′50.64″N 8°40′52.51″W
- System: Porto Metro station
- Platforms: 2 side platforms
- Tracks: 2

Construction
- Structure type: At grade
- Accessible: Yes

History
- Opened: 7 December 2002

Services
Preceding station	Porto Metro	Following station
Matosinhos Sul towards Senhor de Matosinhos	Line A	Parque Real towards Estádio do Dragão
Location

Câmara de Matosinhos is a light rail station on the Porto Metro system in the municipality of Matosinhos, Portugal. The station is on line A of the Metro, which provides a direct connection to the centre of the city of Porto. It is situated near Matosinhos City Hall and was opened in 2002.

While much of the first stage of the Porto Metro was built using the trackbed of the network of 1,000 mm (3 ft 3 3/8 in) gauge railways that served the area to the north of Porto, including a line to Matosinhos, the Câmara de Matosinhos station is on a new alignment created for the Metro. The new station was on the first section of the Porto Metro to open and was inaugurated on 7 December 2002, with commercial services starting on 1 January 2003.

Câmara de Matosinhos is a through station on line A. The next station to the west is Matosinhos Sul. To the east, the next station is Parque Real. The platforms are at street level, with two through tracks served by two side platforms accessible directly from the street. There are four or five trains per hour in each direction.
