= Vasco da Gama station (Porto Metro) =

Light rail station in Matosinhos, Portugal

Vasco da Gama
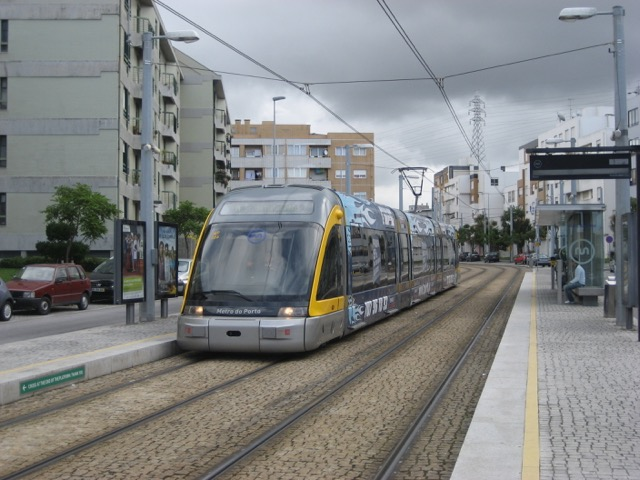
- Track and platforms

General information
- Location: Matosinhos; Portugal
- Coordinates: 41°11′25″N 8°39′39.50″W
- System: Porto Metro station
- Platforms: 2 side platforms
- Tracks: 2

Construction
- Structure type: At grade
- Accessible: Yes

History
- Opened: 7 December 2002

Services
Preceding station	Porto Metro	Following station
Estádio do Mar towards Senhor de Matosinhos	Line A	Senhora da Hora towards Estádio do Dragão
Location

Vasco da Gama is a light rail station on the Porto Metro system in the municipality of Matosinhos, Portugal. The station is on line A of the Metro, which provides a direct connection to the centre of the city of Porto. It is situated in the centre of the Avenida Vasco da Gama and was opened in 2002.

While much of the first stage of the Porto Metro was built using the trackbed of the network of 1,000 mm (3 ft 3 3/8 in) gauge railways that served the area to the north of Porto, including a line to Matosinhos, the Vasco da Gama station is on a new alignment created for the Metro. The new station was on the first section of the Porto Metro to open and was inaugurated on 7 December 2002, with commercial services starting on 1 January 2003.

Vasco da Gama is a through station on line A. The platforms are at street level, with two through tracks served by two side platforms accessible directly from the street. There are four or five trains per hour in each direction. The next station to the west is Estádio do Mar. To the east, and just before the next station of Senhora da Hora, line A joins lines B, C, E and F to run together through the centre of Porto.
