= Ramal de Matosinhos =

Portuguese railway line

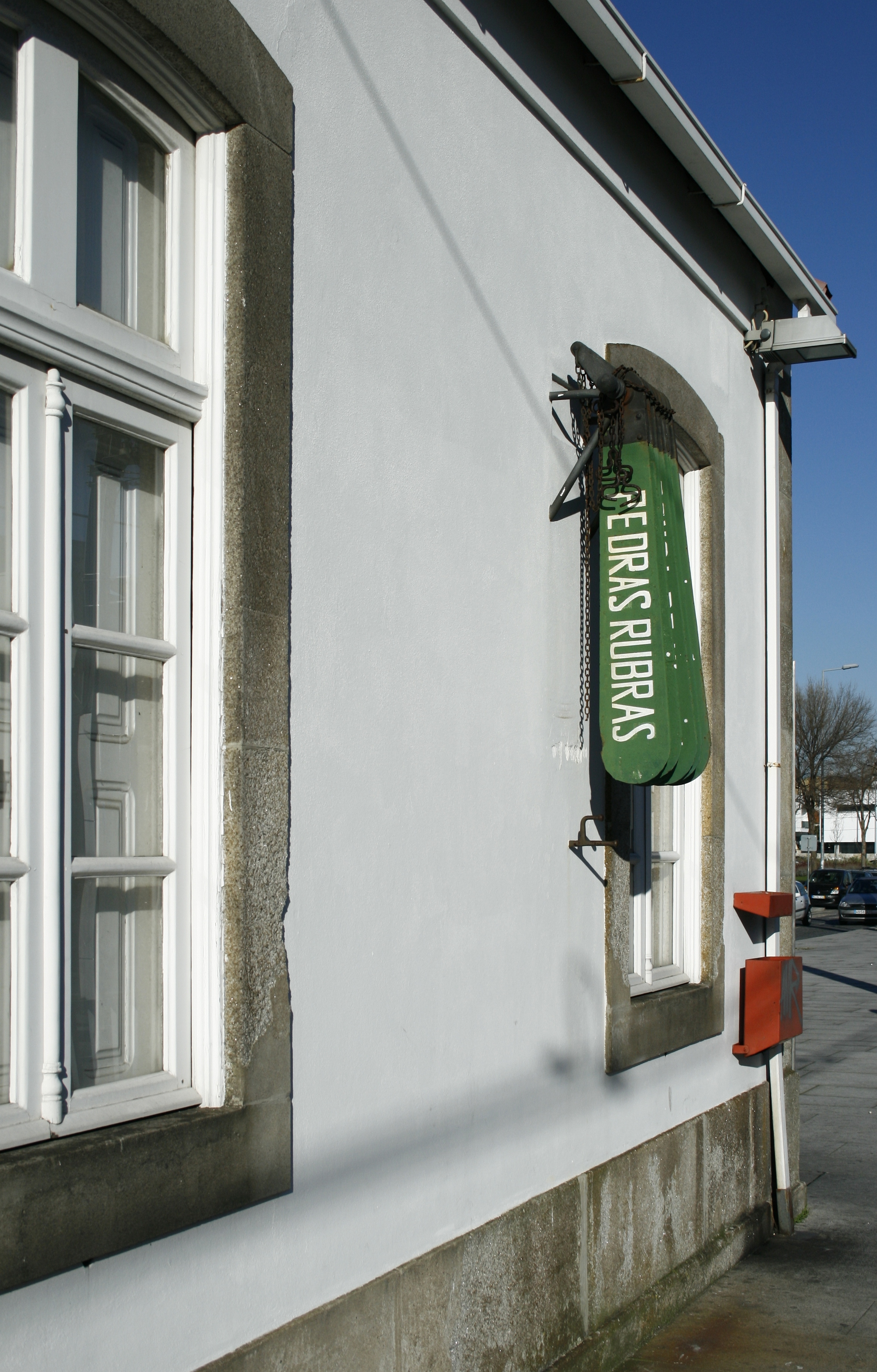
- Destination indicator at Senhora da Hora

Overview
- Status: Closed
- Termini: Pedreiras de São Gens; Leixões

History
- Opened: 1884
- Closed: 1965-07-01

Technical
- Line length: 6 km (3.7 mi)
- Track gauge: 1,000 mm (3 ft 3 3/8 in) metre gauge
- Old gauge: 900 mm (2 ft 11 7/16 in)

Location on the network
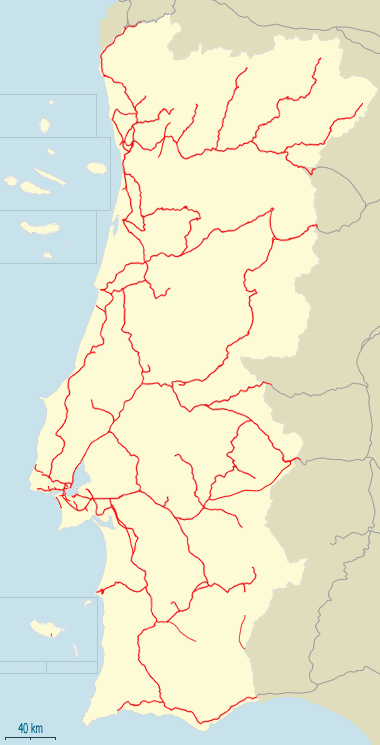

+ São Gens × Leixões (🔎)

The Ramal de Matosinhos or Matosinhos branch railway, originally called the Ramal de Leixões, was a 6 kilometres (3.7 mi) long metre-gauge railway line in northern Portugal which connected the São Gens quarries to the Port of Leixões, via Senhora da Hora. Opened in 1884 to transport stone for the port's construction, it was later adapted for passenger and freight services, including fish and industrial goods. The line closed in 1965 to allow for urban redevelopment and parts of its track bed have since been reused for Porto Metro’s Line A and for pedestrian paths in Matosinhos.

== History ==
The branch was built in 1884 by Dauderni & Duparchy to transport stone for the construction of the Port of Leixões from the São Gens quarries, in Custoias, near Senhora da Hora. It measured about 6 kilometres (3.7 mi) in length and was originally built in a 900 millimetres (3.0 ft) gauge, crossing the Porto à Póvoa line in Senhora da Hora at a right angle. The original junction was later replaced in 1898 with a new connection facing the opposite direction, which allowed more direct service between Porto-Boavista and Leixões. On the Leixões side, it included the construction of a railway bridge to Leça da Palmeira on the northern bank of the Leça river.

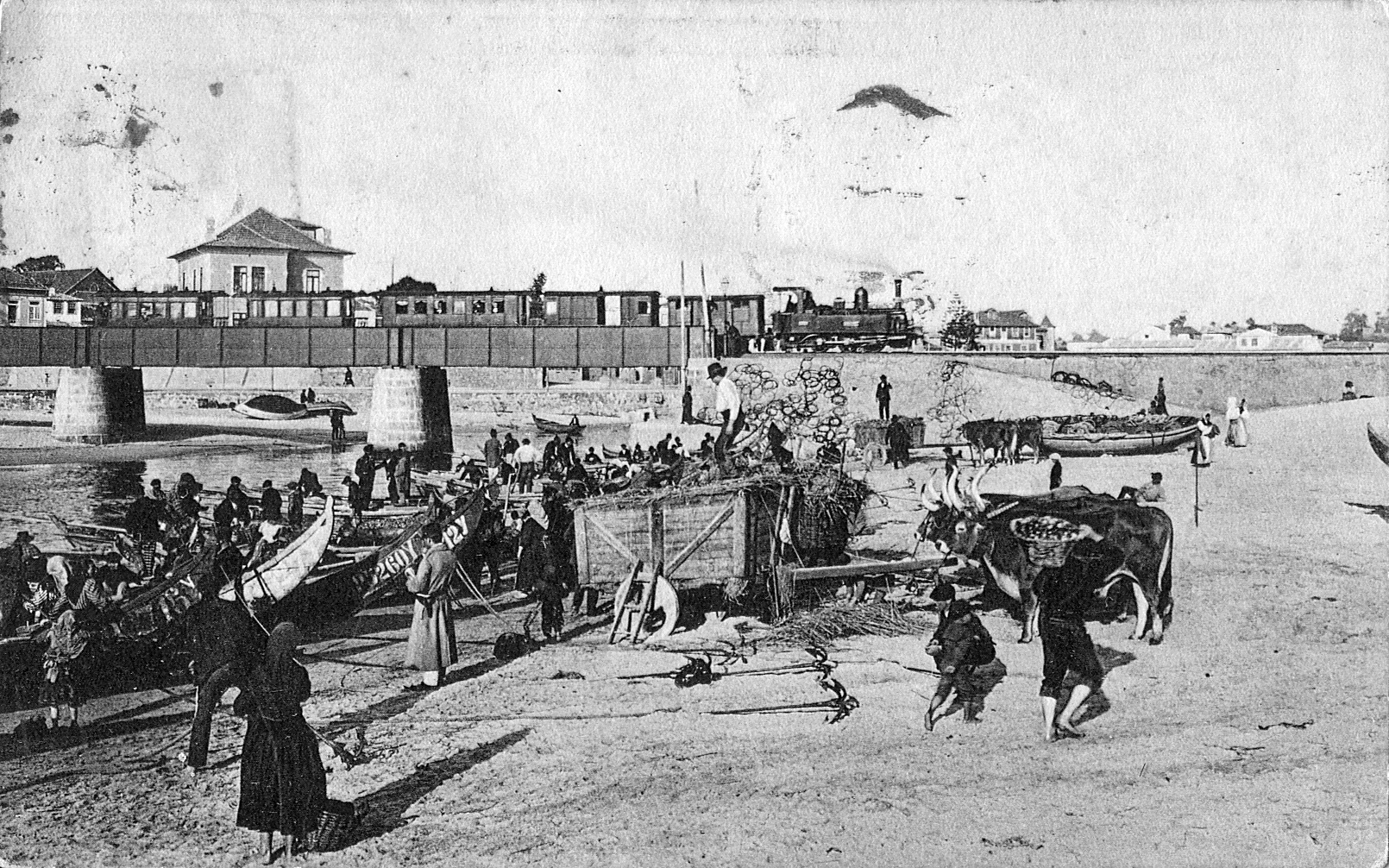
Postcard displaying the port of Leixões sometime between 1880 and 1920

Following a government order in 1891 and an agreement in 1892 with Duparchy & Bartissol, the port works contractors at the time, the Companhia do Caminho de Ferro do Porto à Póvoa began leasing the branch. Passenger services started on 6 May 1893, followed by freight services later that year, including fish and stone. On 28 March 1895, the Leixões port, its works, quarries, and railway passed to state ownership and administration, though the leasing of the Matosinhos branch continued. That same year, on 30 July, a passenger station and two auxiliary stations at the port of Leixões were inaugurated, establishing a connection with maritime cargo and passenger services.

In 1927, the line started being managed by the Companhia dos Caminhos de Ferro do Norte de Portugal, following a company merger. This placed it under the same management as the Guimarães line and led to the regauging of both the Porto à Póvoa line and the Matosinhos branch to metre-gauge. However, in 1933, the company faced financial challenges and its board was suspended by the Portuguese state and replaced by an administrative commission. During this period, there was a proposed plan to add a second track to the Matosinhos branch, but this did not follow through. Around the 1940s, the expansion of the Port of Leixões led to the demolition of the railway bridge over the Leça River, shortening the railway line. In 1947 the railway line became part of the Portuguese Railways.

The Ramal de Matosinhos was officially closed on 1 July 1965, following various operational problems and incidents, and to make way for major urban development works along its route. Passenger services were replaced by a bus service between Senhora da Hora and Leixões, operated by STCP in coordination with the Portuguese Railways.

Following the railway's closure, the track bed has been repurposed for other infrastructure projects. In the early 2000s, part of the track bed was reused for the construction of Line A of Porto Metro. Furthermore, a section between National Road 12 (Circumvalação) and the seaside in Matosinhos was converted into a walking path. It intersected diagonally the grid plan of Matosinhos and consequently was named Broadway, in reference to the original Broadway in New York City.

== See also ==
- List of railway lines in Portugal
- List of Portuguese locomotives and railcars
- History of rail transport in Portugal
