= Guimarães railway station =

Railway station in Guimarães, Portugal

Guimarães
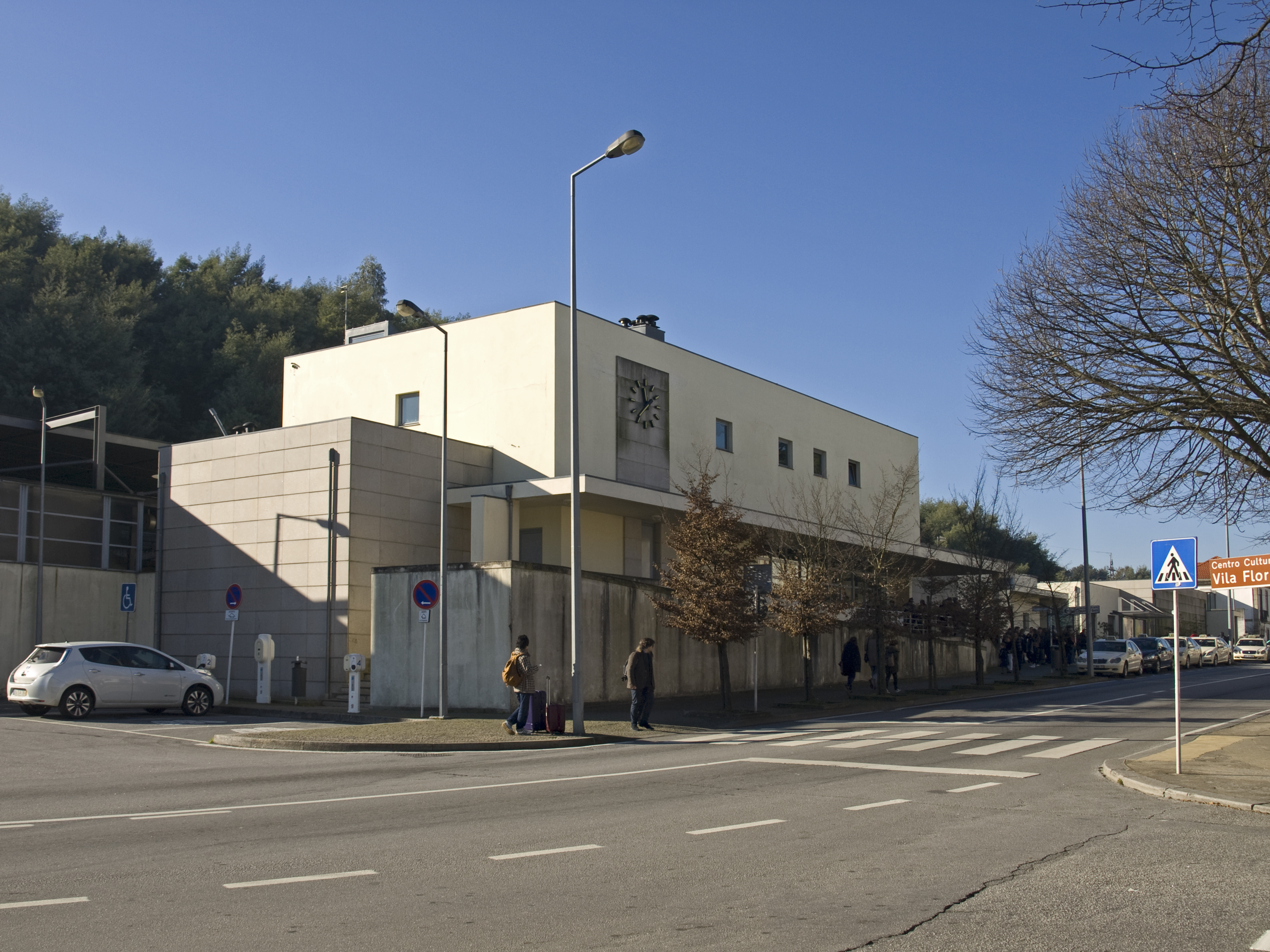
- New Guimarães station, 2016

General information
- Location: Urgezes, Guimarães
- Coordinates: 41°26′07.05″N 8°17′42.21″W
- Line: Guimarães line
- Tracks: 2

History
- Opened: April 14, 1884; 142 years ago
Location
- Location within Portugal

Guimarães railway station is the terminus of the Linha de Guimarães, a railway line that connects the city of Porto with Guimarães, in the Braga District of Portugal. The station was officially opened on 14 April 1884.

The original line to Guimarães was built to 1,000 mm (3 ft 3 3/8 in) gauge, and until 1932 passengers for Porto had to change trains onto the Linha do Minho at Trofa. During the 1930s, successive line extensions eventually allowed trains to run through to Trindade station in Porto city centre. In 2004, the line was rebuilt to 1,668 mm (5 ft 5 21/32 in) gauge, and connected to the Linha do Minho at Trofa. Trains now run through to Campanhã and São Bento stations in Porto.

== Description ==
=== Location and access ===
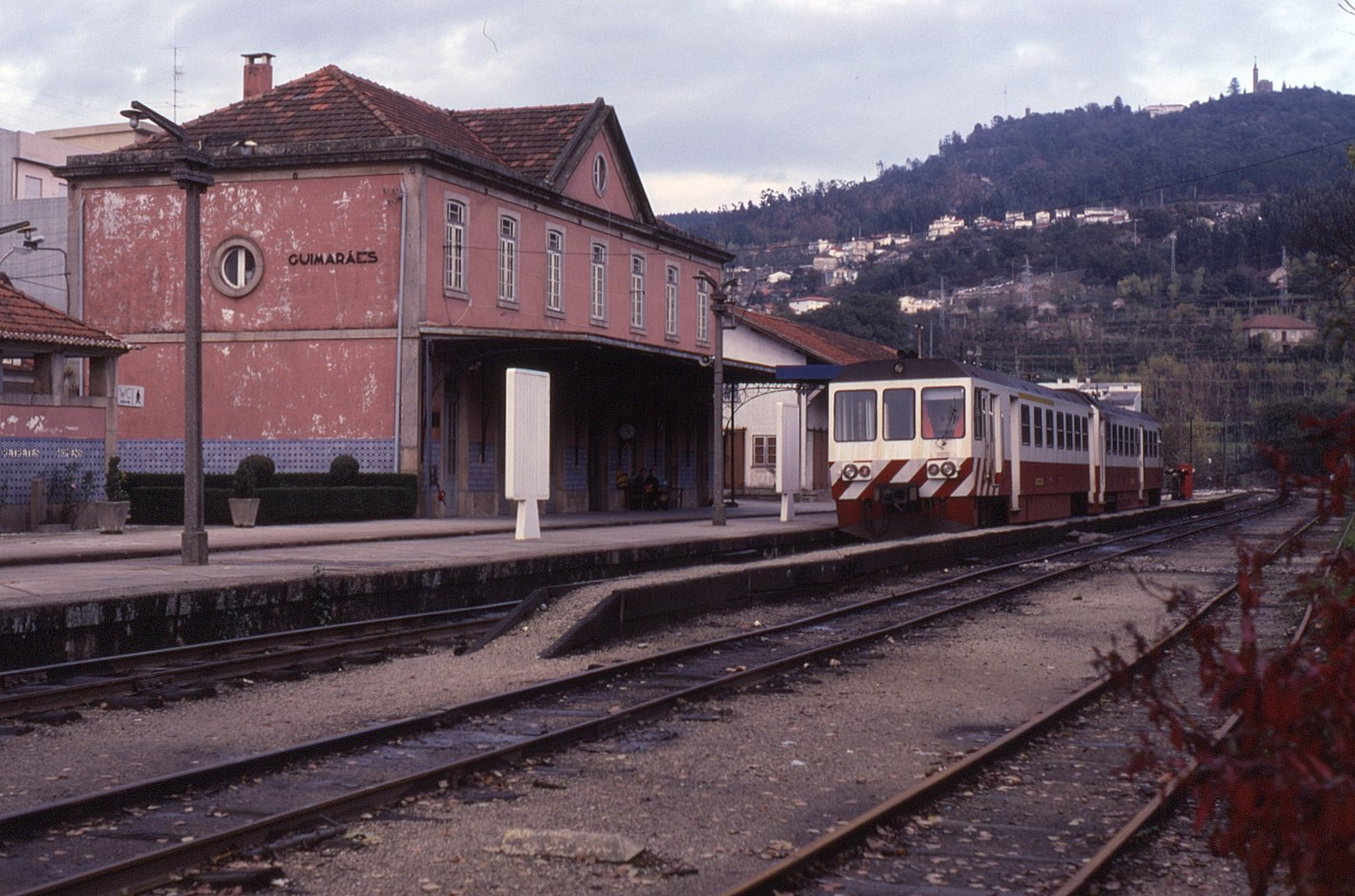
Old Guimarães station viewed from the rail side in 1990

The station is located on the south side of the Avenida Dom João IV, in the city of Guimarães. It is just to the south of the buffer zone around the UNESCO world heritage Historic Centre of Guimarães and Couros Zone.

The station is at the eastern end of the Linha de Guimarães, a single track line that fans out into four tracks as it approaches the terminus. The four tracks are between 205 and 292 metres (673 and 958 ft) long, while the platforms are 220 metres (720 ft) long and 90 centimetres (3 ft) tall. There is a trailing siding to the west of the platforms.

The old and new station buildings are adjacent to each other, between the railway platforms and the Avenida Dom João IV, and are in the freguesia or civil parish of Urgezes. The old station building is now used as a clinic.

== History ==
=== Background ===
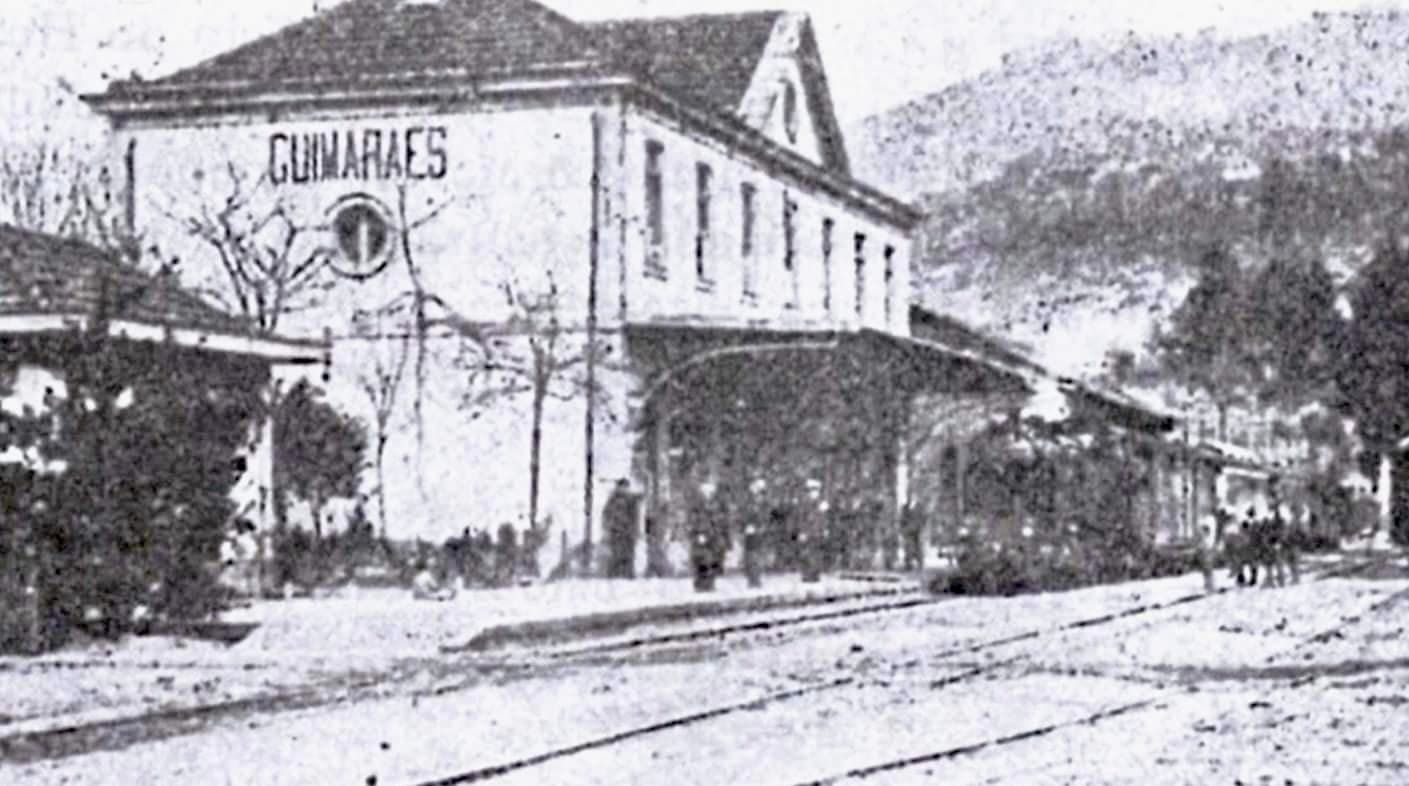
The first ever train at the Guimarães train station, 14 April 1884.

In the middle of the 19th century, the Minho region suffered from a lack of communication with the rest of Portugal, due to its poor railway infrastructure. This improved after the Portuguese Regeneration led by Fontes Pereira de Melo, when many railway lines were created, including those from Porto to Braga and Guimarães.

One of the first projects aiming to bring rails to Guimarães was made by the Minho District Railway Company Limited, who planned to build tracks from Santo Tirso to Guimarães, but the company filled for bankruptcy in January 1879. Later that year, a new concession was opened for a line to Guimarães.

=== Construction and opening ===
The Guimarães Railway Company started construction on the Trofa to Vizela line, with the first section being opened on 31 December 1883. The next section, which included Guimarães station, opened on 14 April 1884. On 16 September 1895, the Railway Gazette reported that contracts had been awarded to start construction on an avenue between Toural Square and Guimarães Station.

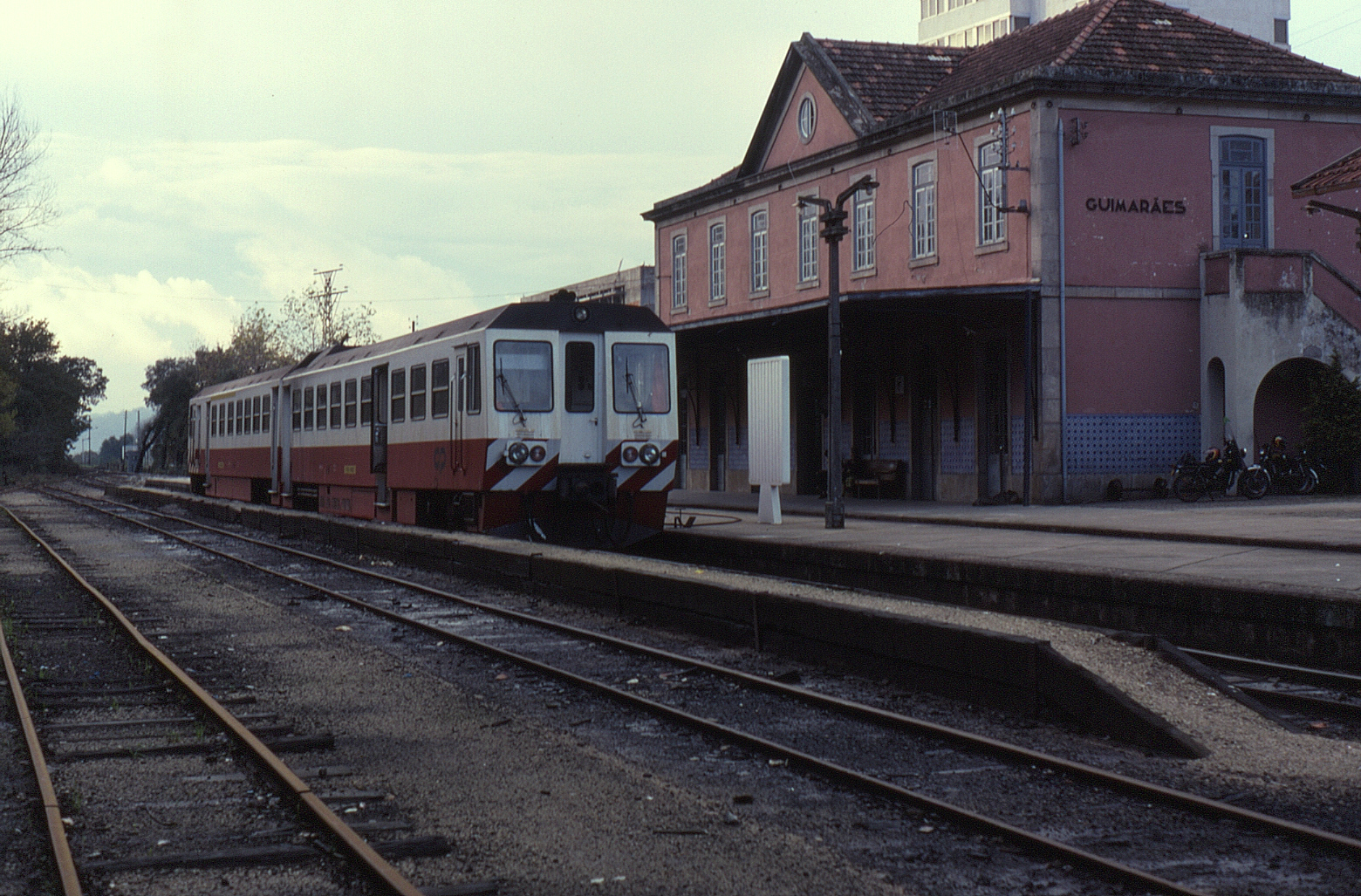
Old Guimarães station, 1990

=== 20th century ===
Guimarães ceased to be a terminal station on 21 July 1907, when an extension of the line to Fafe opened. In 1913, there were stage-coaches from Guimarães station to Caldas das Taipas and Braga.

In 1927, the companies of Guimarães and Póvoa, that managed the Porto-Póvoa-Famalicão line, merged into a single company called Companhia dos Caminhos de Ferro do Norte de Portugal [North Portugal Railway Company]. On 14 March 1932 a new section between Guimarães, Senhora da Hora and Trofa was opened, with part of the ceremony taking place at Guimarães Station, which was decked out for the event. By around 7 pm, the inaugural train arrived at Guimarães station, where a reception was held for president of the Portuguese republic, Óscar Carmona. In 1937, a special train ran to Guimarães, to transport the railway sapper veterans. A ceremony was held in the square in front of the station.

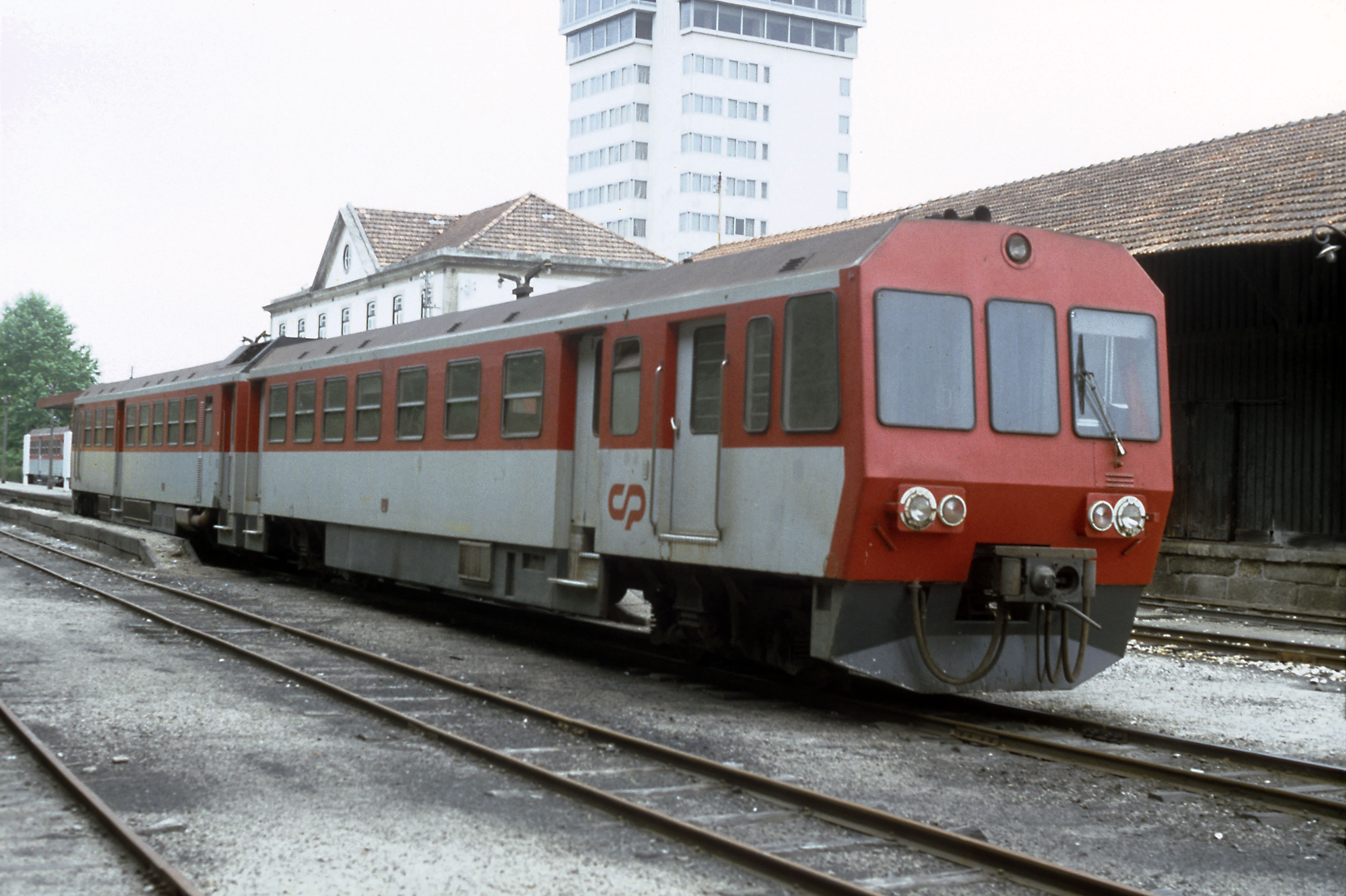
Train in the old Guimarães station, 1996

In 1947, the North railway company was given to the Company of Portuguese Railway, that had interests on the old railways of that company, including the Guimarães line.

Services beyond the station to Fafe were withdrawn in 1986, and Guimarães reverted to being a terminus.

=== 21st century ===
In the 1990s, the Cabinet of the Nó Ferroviário of Porto started a requalification program of the rails located around the city of Porto, that were, at that time, outdated and didn't keep up with demand, including the Guimarães line. This program had the objective of improving de working conditions, by improving infrastructure and getting new trains. The Guimarães line, was improved by improving the electrification and altering the track gauge, remodeling many stations, and installing electronic signals, the line resumed operations in 2004.

In August 2007, a passenger was electrocuted, as well as two fireman that tried to rescue him; they were transported to the Senhora da Oliveira Hospital where they all made a full recovery.

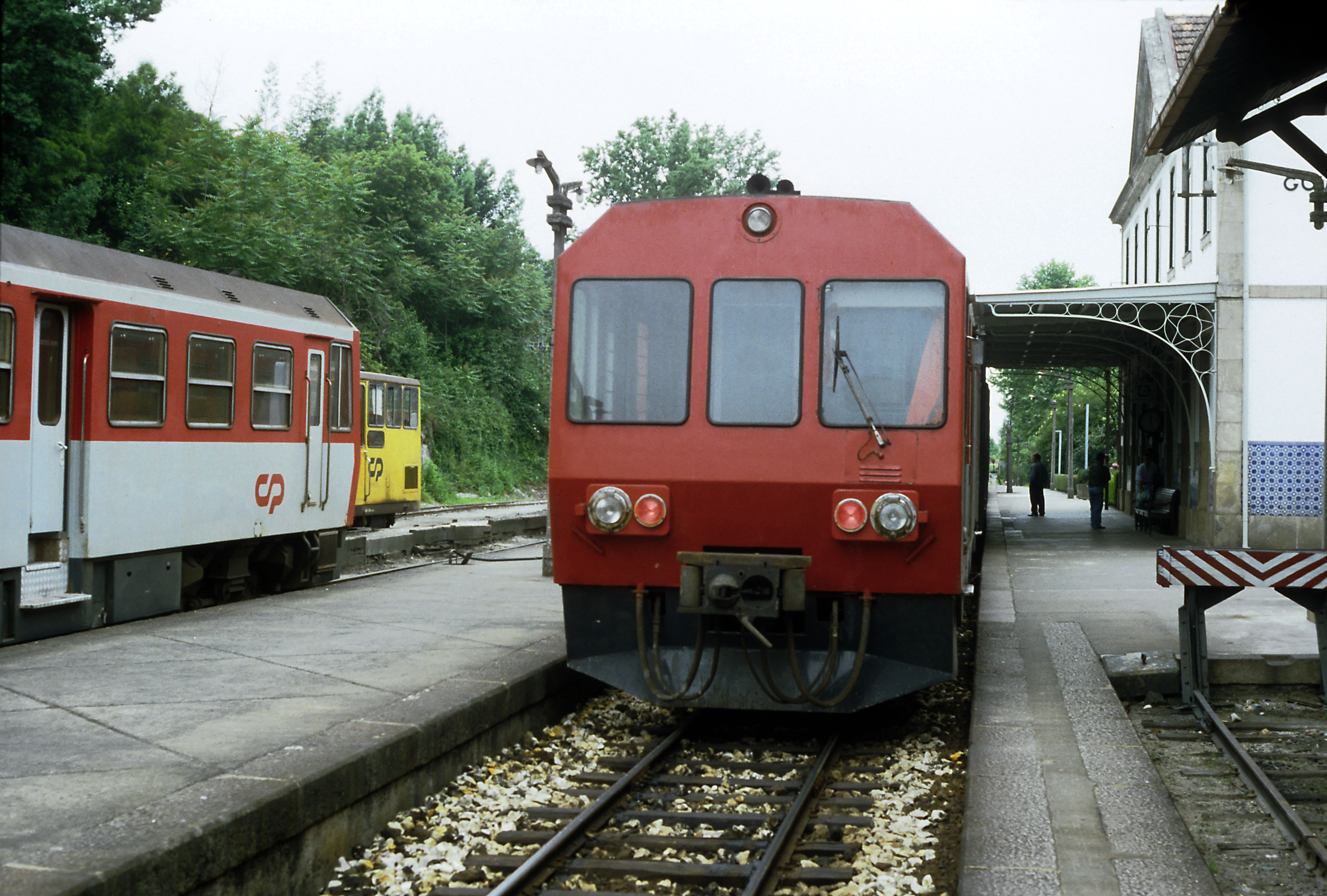
Guimarães Station in 1996

== Expansions to other lines ==
On 16 August 1895, the railway gazette started planning a line between Guimarães and Famalicão, and on 1 September 1899, it was reported that construction had started. In 16 February 1901, the line was requested to be built to accommodate Horsecar trams, with steam traction.

On the railway gazette of 1 December 1899, it was announced that Italian engineer Cachapuz had requested a license to build many railway lines in the north region of Portugal, including a line from Guimarães to Braga. A decree dated 27 April 1903 ordered the opening of a public tender for this line, along with those in Vale do Lima and Alto Minho.

== See also ==
- Comboios de Portugal
- Infraestruturas de Portugal
- Rail transport in Portugal
- History of rail transport in Portugal

== Bibliography ==
- Davies, W J K (1998). Narrow Gauge Railways of Portugal. Plateway Press. ISBN 978-1-871980-35-6.
- Reis, Francisco; Gomes, Rosa; Gomes, Gilberto; et al. (2006). Os Caminhos de Ferro Portugueses 1856-2006 [Portuguese Railways 1856-2006] (in Portuguese). Lisbon: CP-Comboios de Portugal e Público-Comunicação Social S. A. ISBN 989-619-078-X.
