= CP Class 9600 =

Portuguese diesel multiple unit train class

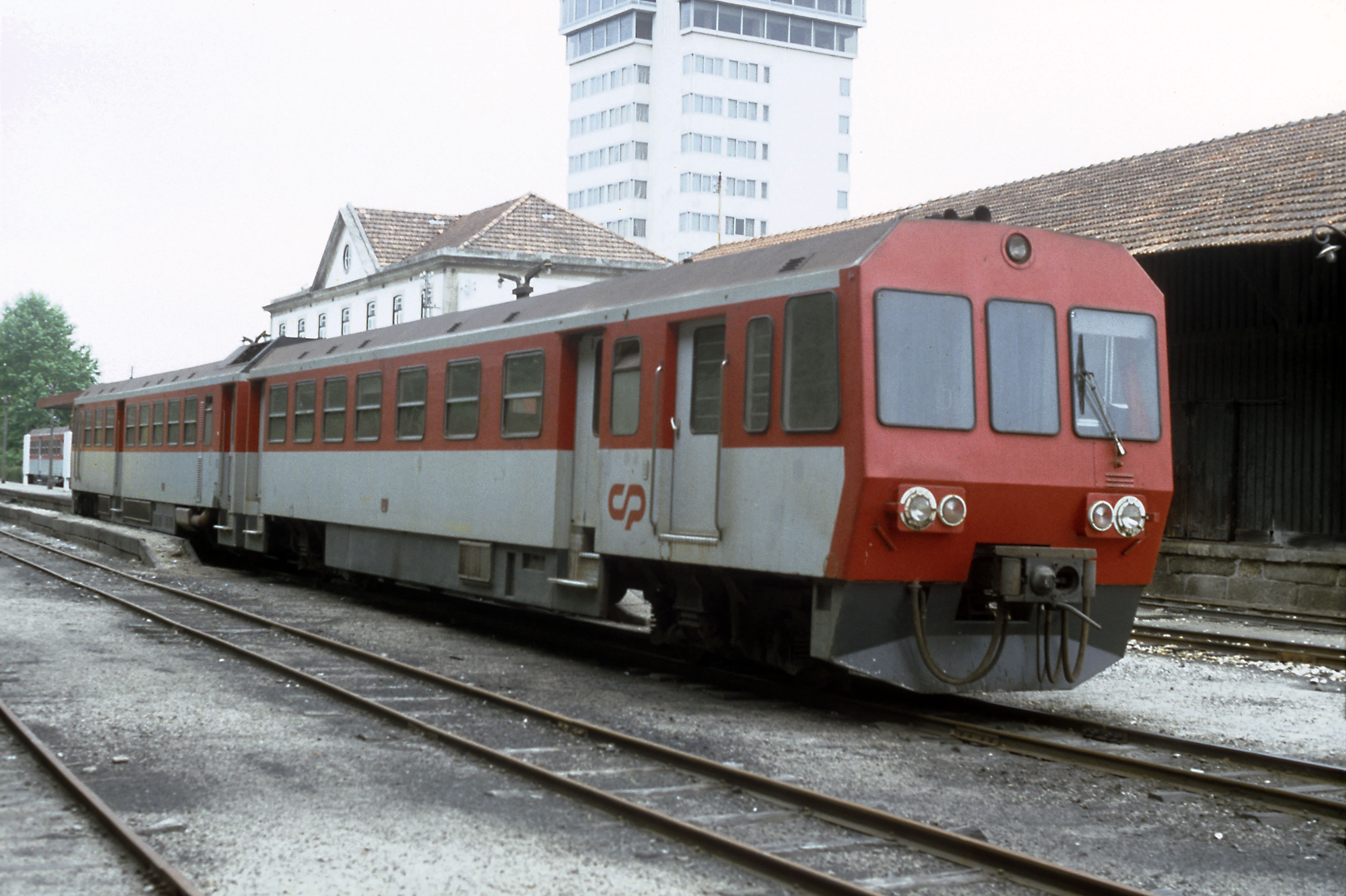
A Série 9600 diesel multiple unit train at Guimarães station in 1996. The line was electrified and rebuilt as a 1668 mm gauge railway between 2002 and 2004.

The Série 9600 are a class of diesel multiple unit train built for 1,000 mm (3 ft 3 3/8 in) metre gauge lines on Portuguese Railways (CP). They entered service in 1979. They were later supplemented by the Série 9630.

The Série 9600 were extensively used on the local train services (such as the Guimarães line) from Trindade station in Porto, which closed in 2002 for conversion to Porto Metro operations. After 2009, the Vouga line remained the sole metre gauge line operated by CP, but this line is now operated by the later Série 9630 units. Following the closure of the Porto local services, many of the Série 9600 units were exported for further service in Argentina and Cameroon.

The units exported to Argentina were refurbished at the Grupo Emepa railways shops in Chascomus, and are currently in use on the Tren de las Sierras tourist railway.
