= Matosinhos Sul station =

Light rail station in Matosinhos, Portugal

Matosinhos Sul
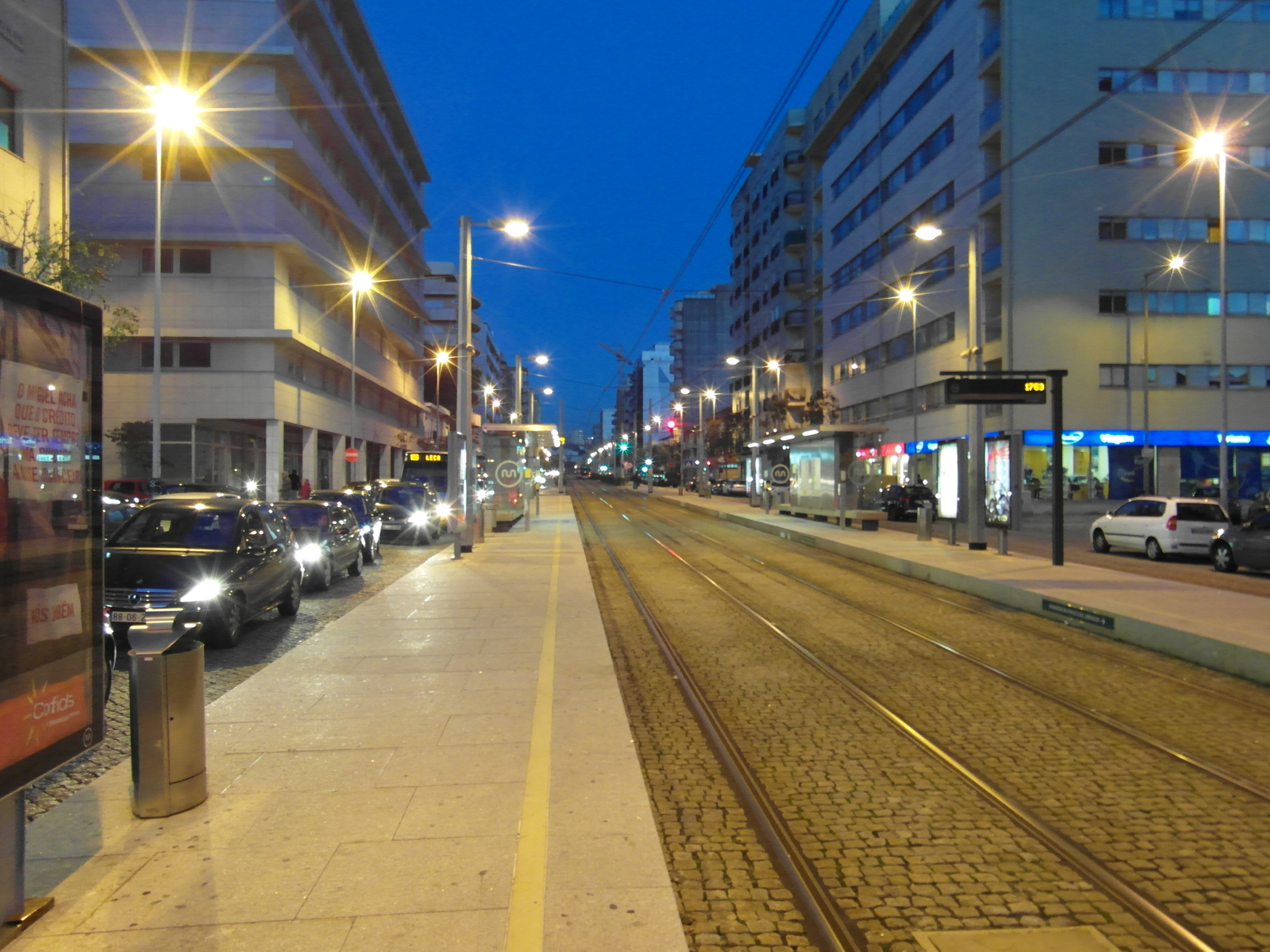
- Track and platforms

General information
- Location: Matosinhos; Portugal
- Coordinates: 41°10′48.50″N 8°41′19″W
- System: Porto Metro station
- Platforms: 2 side platforms
- Tracks: 2

Construction
- Structure type: At grade
- Accessible: Yes

History
- Opened: 7 December 2002

Services
Preceding station	Porto Metro	Following station
Brito Capelo towards Senhor de Matosinhos	Line A	Câmara de Matosinhos towards Estádio do Dragão
Location

Matosinhos Sul is a light rail station on the Porto Metro system in the municipality of Matosinhos, Portugal. The station is on line A of the Metro, which provides a direct connection to the centre of the city of Porto. It is situated near Matosinhos beach and was opened in 2002.

While much of the first stage of the Porto Metro was built using the trackbed of the network of 1,000 mm (3 ft 3 3/8 in) gauge railways that served the area to the north of Porto, including a line to Matosinhos, the Matosinhos Sul station is on a new alignment created for the Metro. The new station was on the first section of the Porto Metro to open and was inaugurated on 7 December 2002, with commercial services starting on 1 January 2003.

Matosinhos Sul is a through station on line A, and the point at which the line moves from an east-west alignment to a north-south one. The next station to the north is Brito Capelo. To the east, the next station is Câmara de Matosinhos. The platforms are at street level, with two through tracks served by two side platforms accessible directly from the street. There are four or five trains per hour in each direction.
