= Estádio do Mar =

Stadium in Matosinhos, Portugal

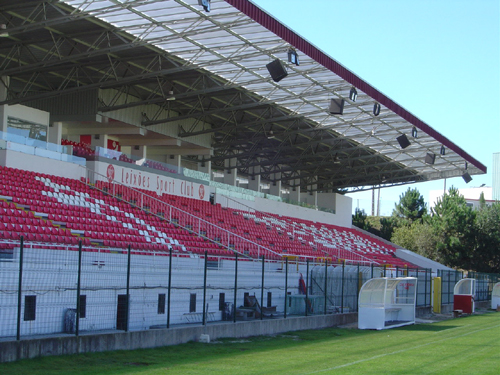
- Estádio do Mar - Main stand
- Interactive map of Estádio do Mar
- Address: Senhora da Hora; Portugal
- Location: Matosinhos, Portugal
- Coordinates: 41°11′2.29″N 8°40′0.91″W
- Capacity: 6,000
- Type: Multi-use
- Surface: Grass
- Current use: Association football
- Public transit: Estádio do Mar

Construction
- Built: 1964
- Opened: 1 January 1964

The Estádio do Mar is a multi-use stadium in Matosinhos, Portugal. It is used mostly for football matches and is the home stadium of Leixões SC. The stadium seats 9,730 and was built in 1963 and inaugurated on 1 January 1964 with a match against Benfica, who won 4–0.

The stadium currently has a capacity of only 6,000 seats, as the top north stand is closed to the public.

The stadium is served by the Estádio do Mar station on line A of the Porto Metro.

== See also ==
- List of football stadiums in Portugal
