= Portuguese Railway Company =

Extinct Portuguese railway company

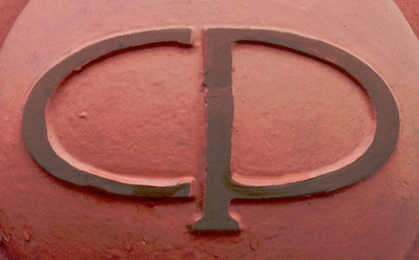
- Company logo, on a CP Class 9300 railcar
- Native name: Companhia dos Caminhos de Ferro Portugueses
- Formerly: Companhia Real dos Caminhos de Ferro Portugueses (Royal Company of Portuguese Railways)
- Company type: S.A.
- Industry: Rail transport
- Predecessor: Central Peninsular Railway Company of Portugal
- Founded: May 11, 1860; 166 years ago in Portugal
- Founder: José de Salamanca y Mayol
- Defunct: April 15, 1975
- Fate: Nationalised by the Portuguese state
- Successor: Comboios de Portugal
- Headquarters: Lisbon, Portugal
- Areas served: Portugal, Spain
- Key people: Pedro Inácio Lopes, Roberto de Espregueira Mendes

The Portuguese Railway Company (Portuguese: Companhia dos Caminhos de Ferro Portugueses) was the main railway operator in Portugal. Founded on 11 May 1860 by the Spanish businessman José de Salamanca y Mayol under the name Companhia Real dos Caminhos de Ferro Portugueses (Royal Company of Portuguese Railways), it changed its name after the 5 October 1910 Revolution. In the first half of the 20th century, it underwent a process of expansion, assimilating several private railway companies and the railways that had been under the management of the Portuguese government. However, the effects of the Second World War, and the advance of road and air transport its economic situation deteriorated to such an extent that, after the Carnation revolution, the company had to be nationalised and transformed into a new institution, called Caminhos de Ferro Portugueses [Portuguese Railways].

== History ==
=== Royal Company of Portuguese Railways ===
==== Formation ====
In the middle of the 19th century, the Central Peninsular Railway Company of Portugal, which had been contracted to build a railway link between Lisbon and Spain, was encountering technical and financial difficulties, which was delaying the project considerably; the English businessman Samuel Morton Peto, who was managing the works, was commissioned to form a new company to replace the Central Peninsular Railway Company of Portugal, but without success, and his contract was terminated on 6 June 1859.

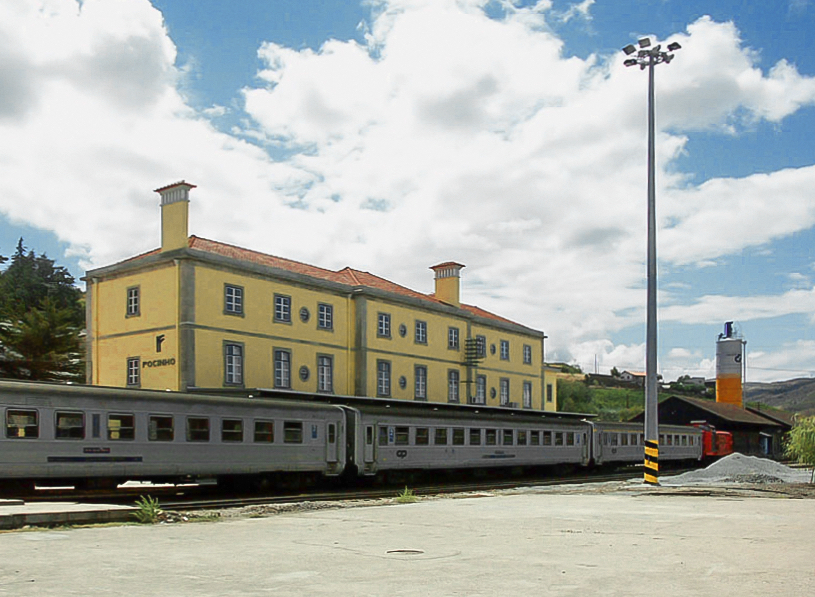
Pocinho railway station, circa 2006

The government therefore drew up a new contract on 30 July with the Spanish businessman José de Salamanca y Mayol, who formed the Companhia Real dos Caminhos de Ferro Portugueses (Royal Company of Portuguese Railways) to build the rail link between the North Line and the East Line; the company's articles of association were drawn up on 12 December and approved on the 22nd of the same month, and the company was formally incorporated on 11 May 1860, although the decree making this official was only published on 20 June.

On 25 June 1865, the Royal Company acquired the rights to operate the Norte line from José de Salamanca. On 10 November, the public deed was approved, and the section already built, between Lisbon and the Asseca Railway Bridge, passed to the Company.

==== Operations ====
In January 1902, one of the locomotives ordered by the company from Fives-Lille to provide fast services had already arrived and was being assembled that month in the workshops in Lisbon. The 1901 report, presented that same month, stated that the company's financial situation was quite favourable, mainly due to the fall in coal prices.

=== Transition to the Portuguese Railway Company ===
After the 5 October 1910 Revolution, the Royal Company of Portuguese Railways was transformed that year into the Portuguese Railway Company.

=== Portuguese Railway Company ===
==== First World War ====
After the outbreak of World War I in 1914, there was a sharp rise in coal prices, which led the company to reduce services and use firewood to power its locomotives, which caused several problems with the maintenance of rolling stock. That year was also marked by several general strikes by railway workers, with serious acts of sabotage taking place which led to the need to order an army intervention.

==== Period between the two World Wars ====
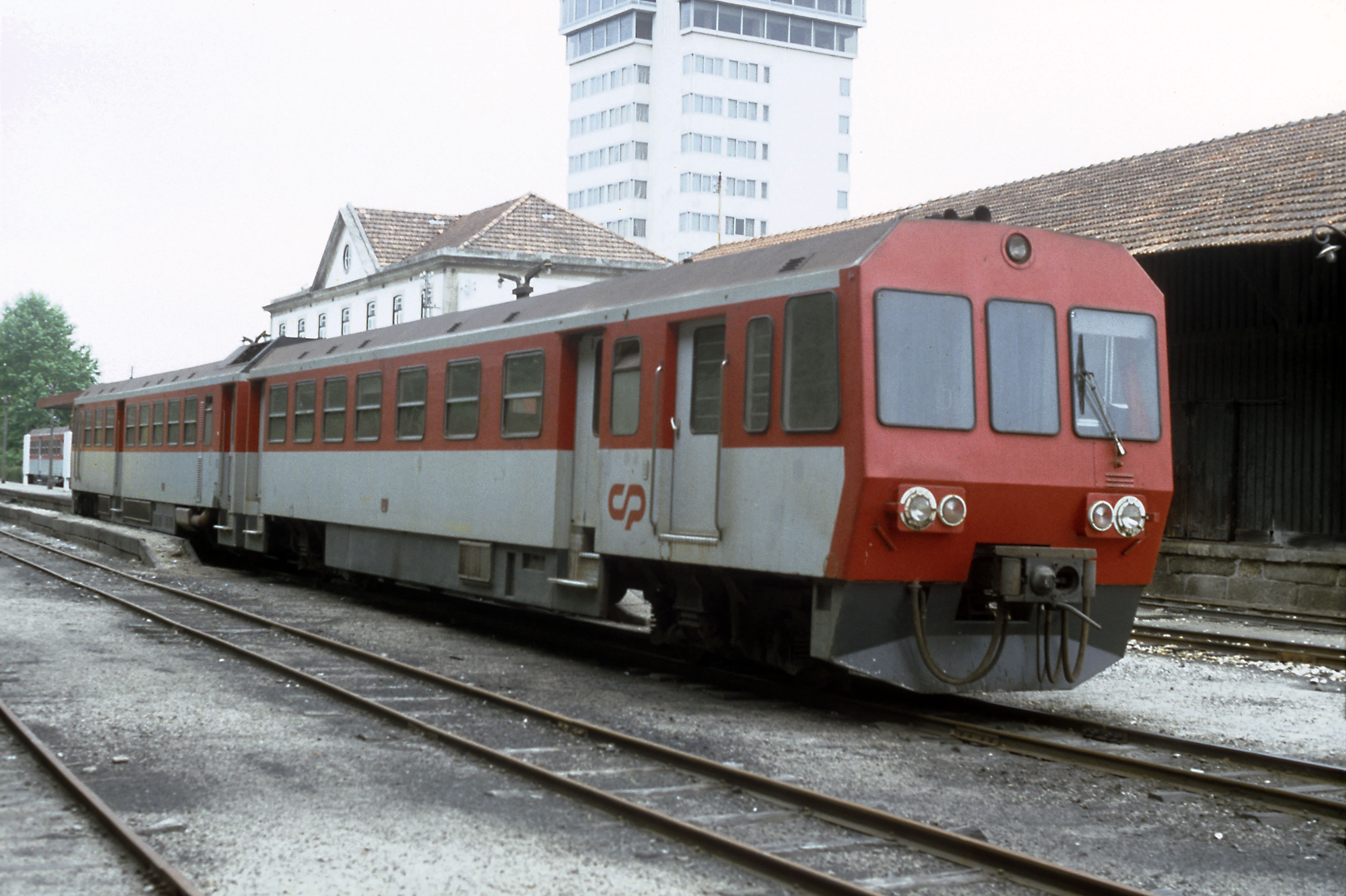
Train arriving at the Guimarães railway station, in June 1996

After the end of the First World War, operating problems remained due to rising prices, to which the operators responded by issuing surcharges. Coal, in particular, remained scarce and overpriced, so the use of firewood in locomotives continued. On the other hand, social problems also continued, aggravated by new measures such as the introduction of the 8-hour working day, which led to various conflicts and strikes, such as the closure of the workshops at the Entroncamento in 1922, which had a detrimental effect on motor equipment.

On 11 May 1927, it won the tender to lease the operation of the Portuguese government's rail links, which until then had been managed by the operator Caminhos de Ferro do Estado [State Railways], and due to its lack of experience in managing narrow-gauge lines, it sublet the Tâmega line to the Companhia dos Caminhos de Ferro do Norte de Portugal [Northern Portugal Railway Company], and the Corgo and Sabor line to the Companhia Nacional de Caminhos de Ferro [National Railway Company]. In 1929, the company's growth trend was reversed due to competition from road transport. In the 1930s, there was a decline in transport, initially only for passengers, and then for goods, which forced a reduction in expenses, such as track maintenance and labour. On the other hand, new techniques and new means of traction were also studied, such as diesel locomotives and railcars.

In 1932, the articles of association were amended and the company became an S.A.

==== World War II ====
During the Second World War, there was a shortage of coal, which again led to a reduction in services. Even so, in 1940, the company started the fast “Flecha de Prata” service between Lisbon and Porto.

==== From the Second World War to the Carnation Revolution ====
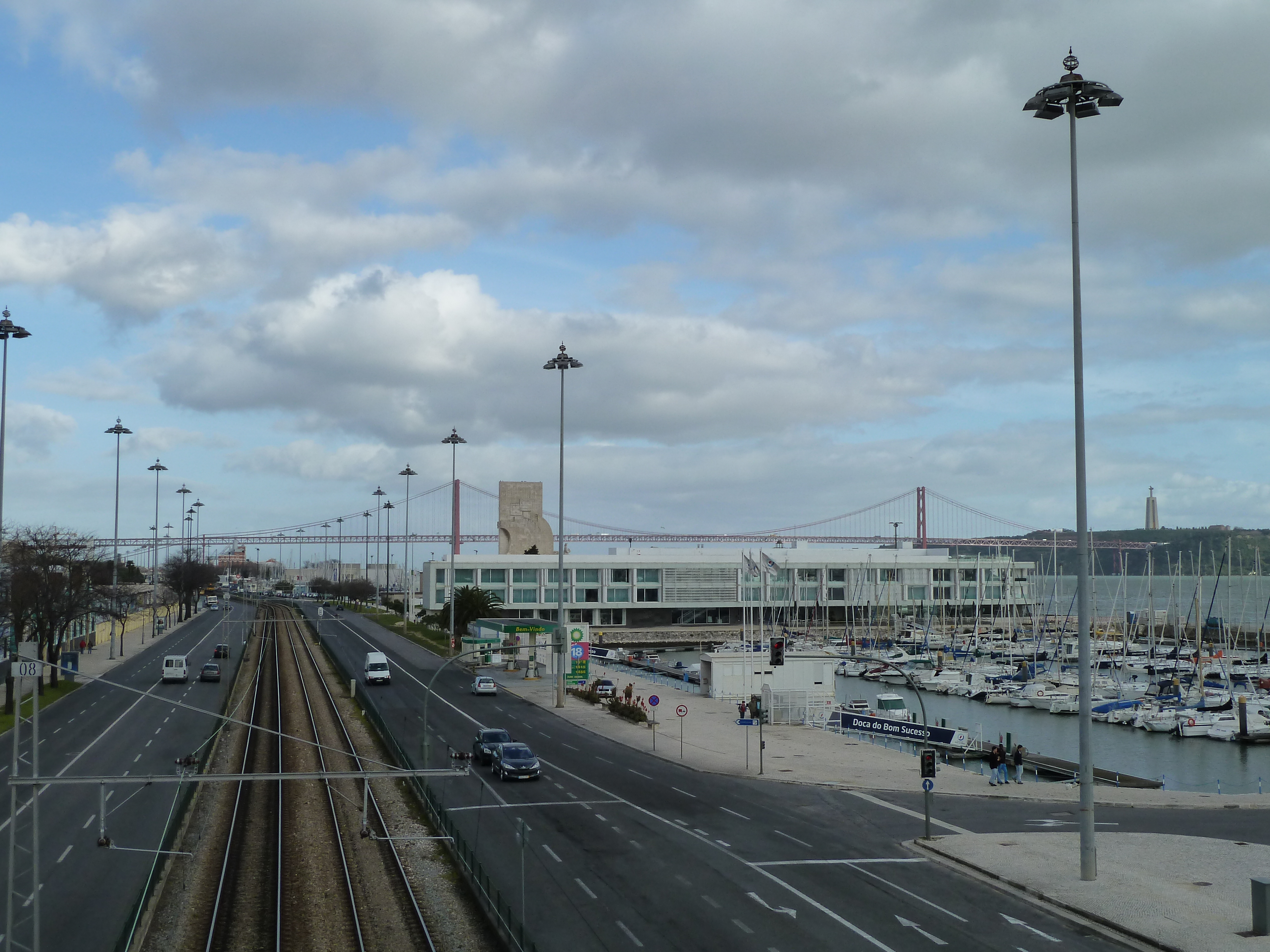
Cascais line, in the area of Belém

In 1945, Law no. 2008 on the coordination of land transport was published, which determined the concentration of all railway operating concessions in a single company; The following year, a deed was signed for the transition of the Portuguese Railways of Beira Alta, Nacional de Caminhos de Ferro and Portuguese Company for the Construction and Operation of Railways into the Companhia dos Caminhos de Ferro Portugueses. In 1947, this company began operating all the broad and narrow gauge lines in Portugal, except for the Cascais line, which had been leased to Sociedade Estoril until 1976.

However, there was a sharp drop in revenue and in 1950 the company was forced to take out a loan of 50 million escudos. The following year, the single contract came into force, reorganising the management of rail transport and changing the company's statutes.

Even so, the company managed to make a number of investments, supported by the First Development Plan (1953-1958), in order to modernise its services; of particular note was the inaugural trip of the fast Foguete service in 1953, and the electrification projects for the Sintra line and the section between Lisbon and Carregado on the Norte line, completed in 1956. In 1959, the company contracted the Ericsson company for the installation of centralised traffic control on the Vendas Novas line. In 1966, new articles of association were published for the company and electrification between Lisbon and Porto was completed; in 1968, a contract was signed with a consortium of SOMAFEL and Somapre for the total renovation of the track.

In 1973, Decree-Law no. 104/73 was published, authorising the Minister of Communications to establish a new concession contract with the Portuguese Railway Company.

=== Carnation Revolution and nationalisation ===
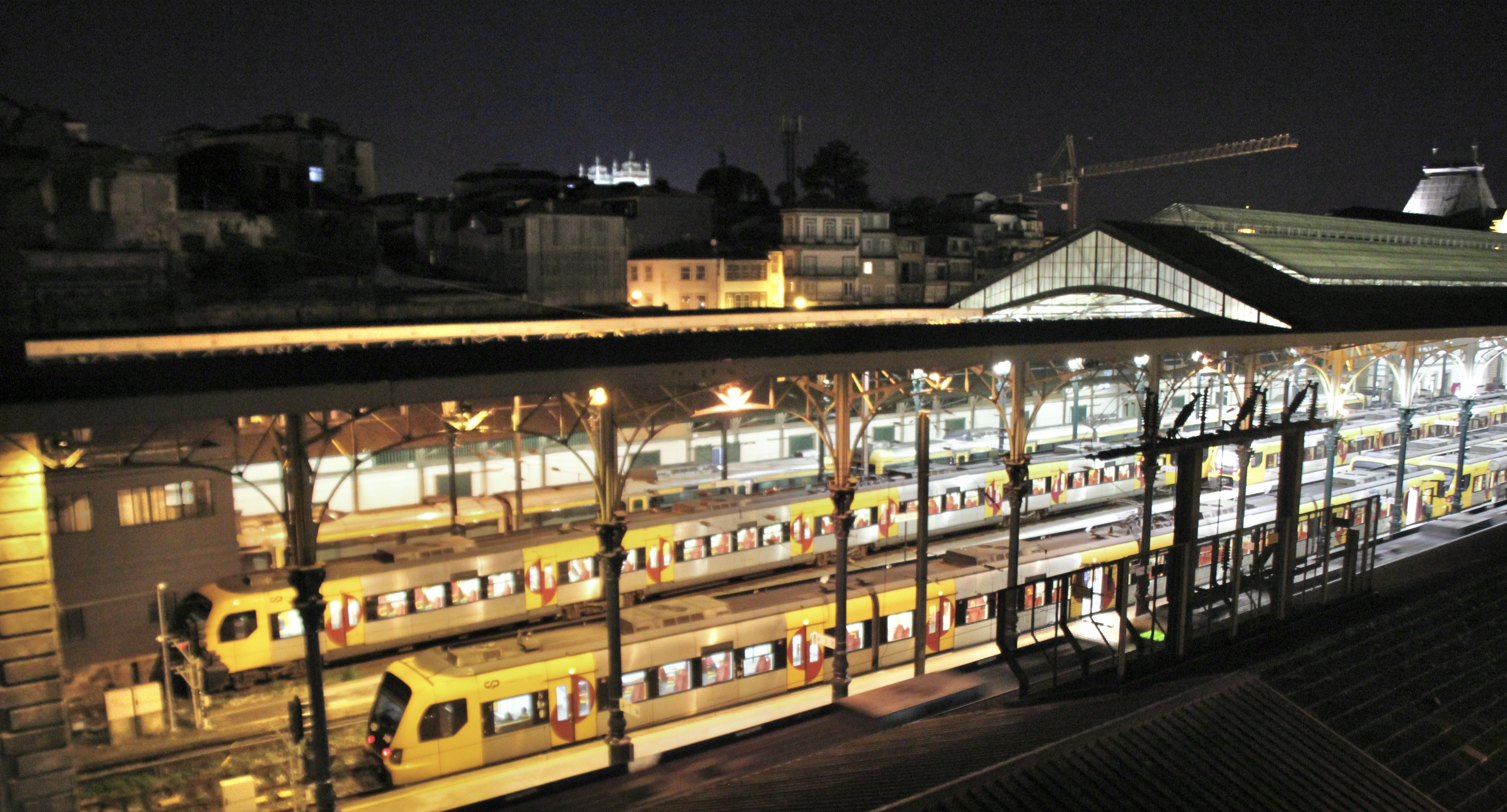
Train arriving at the São Bento railway station in Porto

The Company's situation changed profoundly after the Carnation Revolution, with several inspections revealing serious labour problems, hidden by the organization, which had to be resolved, with damaging effects on the Company's already unstable financial capacity. This situation was worsened by the oil crisis of 1973 and 1979, and by the new priorities of the democratic regime, which substantially reduced support for the company, with which it was only possible to carry out some track construction and maintenance work, such as the installation of the railway accesses to the Sines Industrial Complex, and to continue with the programme to replace steam engine equipment, which had begun around 30 years earlier. In 1975, the company was nationalised, although in practice this process didn't have much effect, since the company was already almost completely subordinated to the government, giving birth to its successor, Comboios de Portugal, on 15 April 1975.

== See also ==
- Infraestruturas de Portugal
- Interrail
- History of rail transport in Portugal

== Bibliography ==
- 100 Obras de Arquitectura Civil no Século XX: Portugal. Lisboa: Ordem dos Engenheiros. 2000. p. 286. ISBN 972-97231-7-6.
- Os Caminhos de Ferro Portugueses 1856-2006. CP-Comboios de Portugal e Público-Comunicação Social S. A. 2006. p. 238. ISBN 989-619-078-X.
- Martins, João Paulo; Brion, Madalena; Sousa, Miguel de; Levy, Maurício; Amorim, Óscar (1996). O Caminho de Ferro Revisitado: O Caminho de Ferro em Portugal de 1856 a 1996. Caminhos de Ferro Portugueses. p. 446.
