= Porto-Trindade railway station =

Former railway station in Porto, Portugal

Porto-Trindade Railway Station Estação Ferroviária de Porto-Trindade
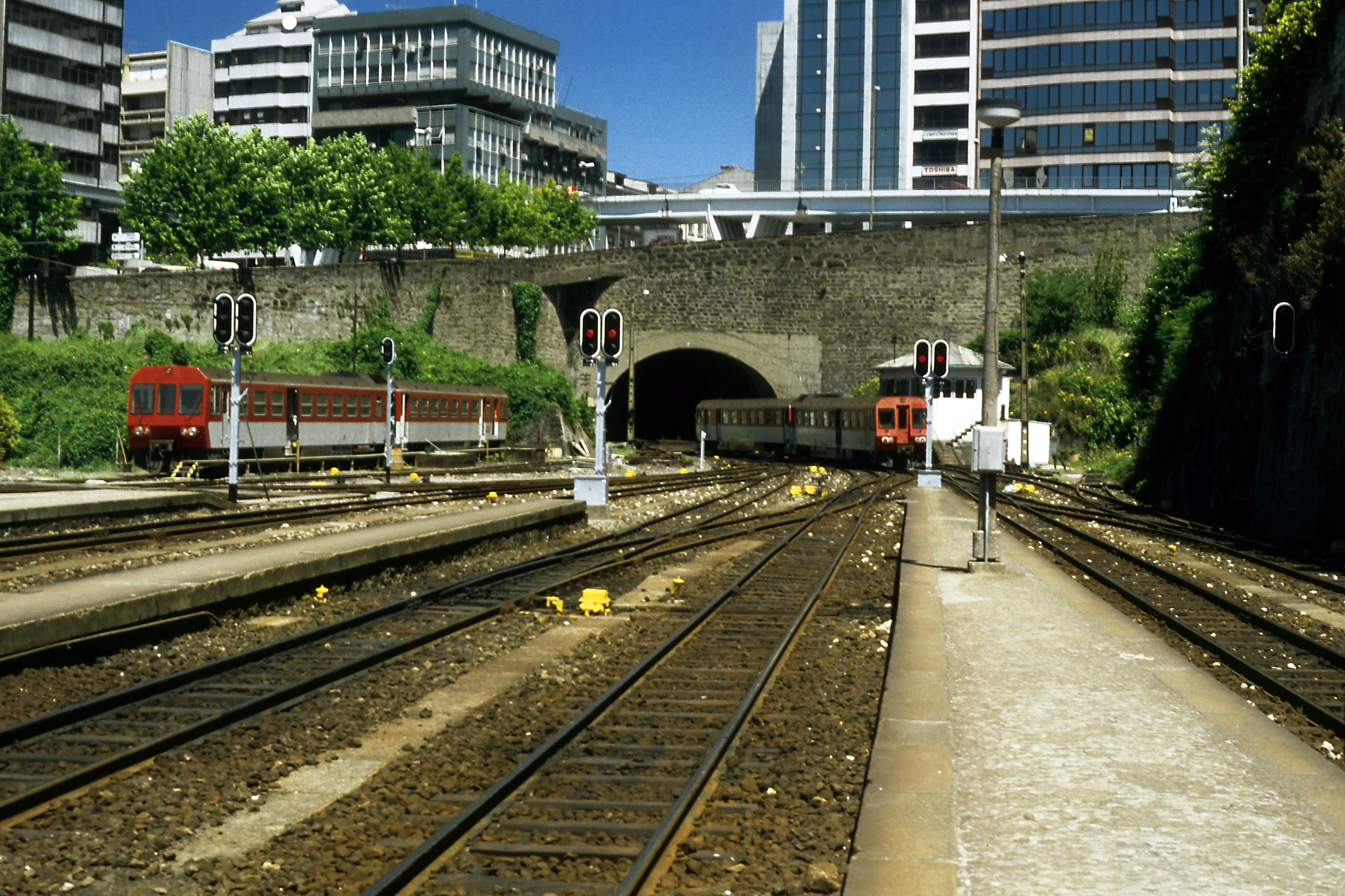
- The station platforms in 1996, with the portal of the Trindade Tunnel in the background

General information
- Location: Porto; Portugal
- Coordinates: 41°9′8.640″N 8°36′34.128″W
- System: Railway Station

History
- Opened: 30 October 1938
- Closed: 28 April 2001
Location

The Porto–Trindade Railway Station was a major railway station in the Portuguese city of Porto. It served as the city terminus for a network of 1,000 mm (3 ft 3 3/8 in) gauge railways that served the area to the north of the city, including lines stretching as far as Matosinhos, Póvoa de Varzim, Vila Nova de Famalicão and Guimarães. It was opened on 30 October 1938 and closed on 28 April 2001. The station site is now occupied by the Trindade station of the Porto Metro, which has also replaced some of the rail services operated from the former station.

== History ==
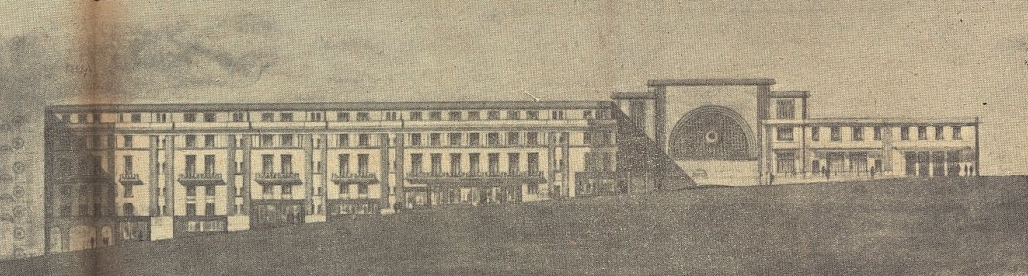
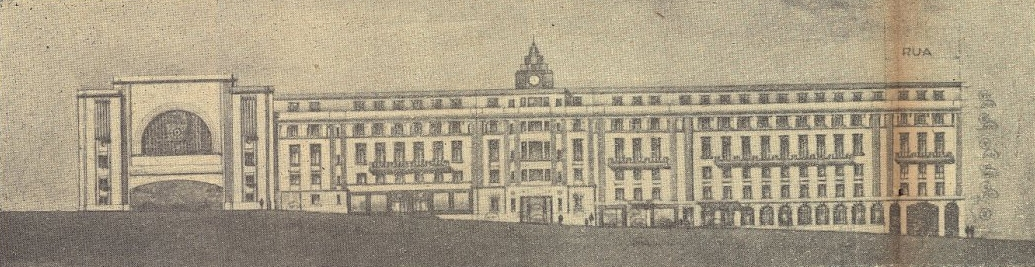
Elevations from the original (and unbuilt) design of the station building

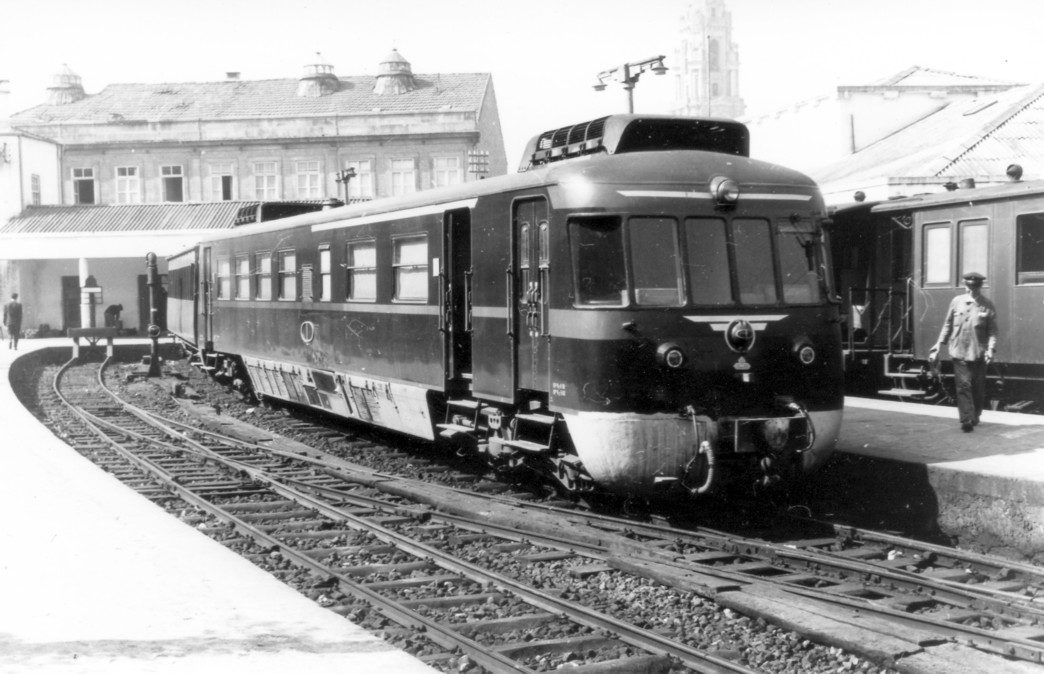
The station in 1965, with a Class 9300 diesel railcar

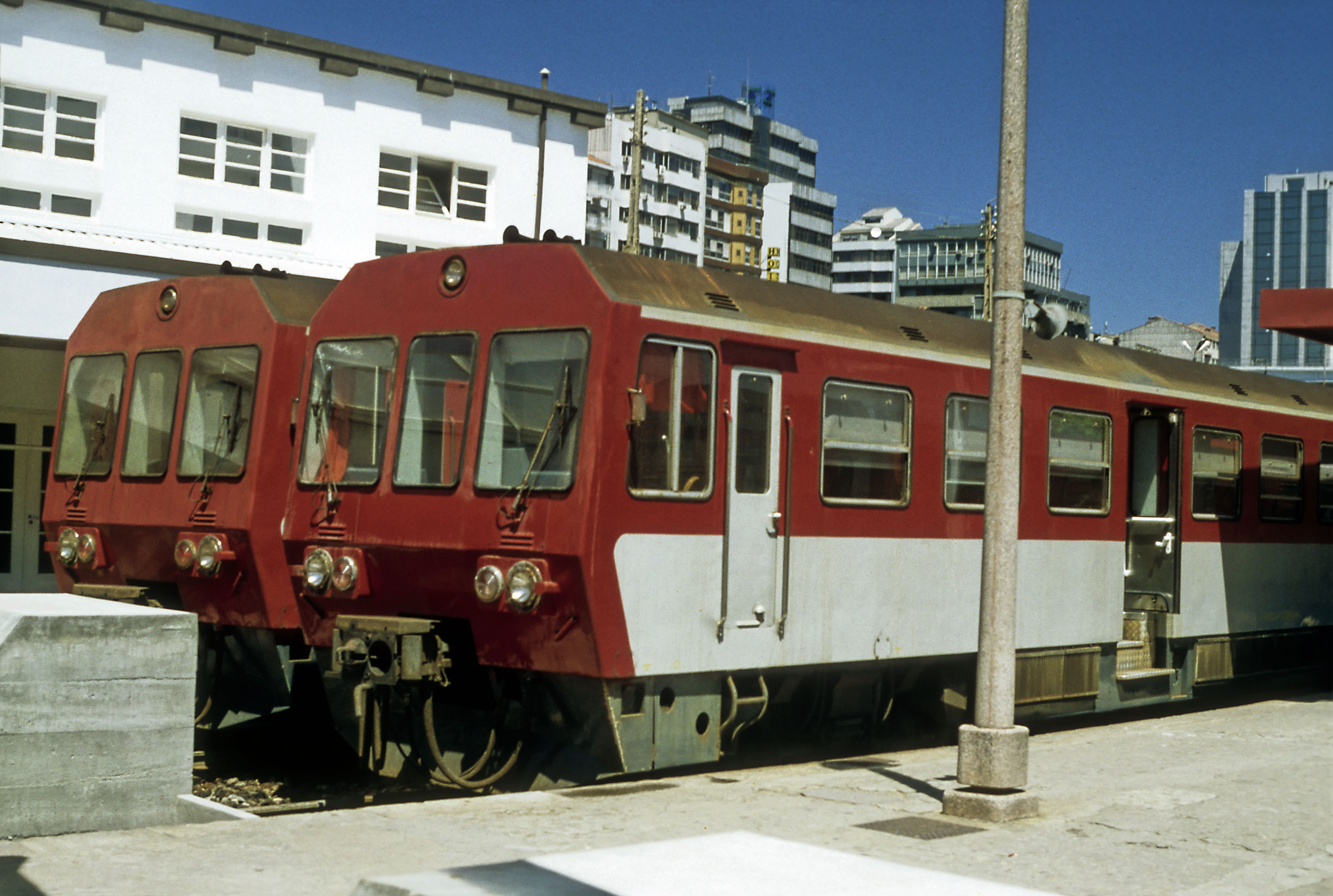
The station in 1996, with a pair of Class 9600 diesel multiple units

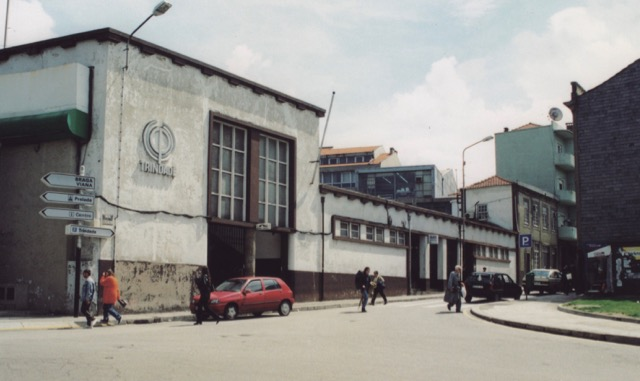
The station building shortly before it was demolished

The first section of the Porto to Póvoa and Famalicão railway line was opened on 1 October 1875, as the first public narrow gauge railway in Portugal. Its Porto terminal station was originally Porto-Boavista station, which was inconveniently located on the edge of what was then the built-up area of Porto. Over the following years, the railway added a branch to Matosinhos, but retained the Boavista terminal.

The plans to extend the line further into the centre of Porto date back to 20 January 1913, when the railway was authorized to extend the line to Trindade, where a new station was to be built. Those plans were not executed, but, in 1926, it again requested the construction of this section, together with a connection between Senhora da Hora and Trofa, linking its line to the existing Guimarães railway line. On 14 January 1927, the company of the Porto to Póvoa and Famalicão line was merged with that of the Guimarães line, forming the Norte de Portugal company.

The link to the Guimarães line was completed on 14 March 1932, and, by early 1933, work on the extension to Trindade was already well under way, with completion expected by the end of that year. However the work encountered difficulties both in expropriation of the land needed and in the construction of the Trindade Tunnel on the approach to the new station. On 5 August 1933, the Portuguese government ordered the dismissal of the management of the company and their replacement by government appointees, claiming that the company was in a financial crisis and could not fulfil its commitments.

The site that had originally been chosen for the new station was at the top of Avenida dos Aliados, next to the City Hall, on land that belonged to the city. A monumental building was planned for the station, facing Ruas do Bonjardim and Formosa. However the additional costs, and the delays caused by the government intervention, forced a rethink, and the station was moved further north, to a site adjoining Rua Alferes Malheiro. The station finally entered into service on 30 October 1938, with a temporary station building. The new station became the main terminus of the Porto suburban metre-gauge network, and Porto-Boavista was then used mainly for freight traffic.

On 1 January 1947, the Norte de Portugal company was integrated into the Portuguese Railway Company, which was responsible for operating most railways in Portugal. The same year, work started on building a permanent station building, which was described by the newspaper Diário de Lisboa as a sober construction, of a certain elegance and proportions, which has two large doors for the entrance of passengers. Two tall windows illuminate the hall, where the ticket offices and baggage check-in will be located. In an adjoining section, there will be the office of the station master, telegraph office, canteen and the exits for passengers.

In 1985, the station was being served by 133 trains per day from Monday to Saturday, and 50 trains on Sundays and holidays. However by 1996, plans were already underway to build a light rail system in Porto, to be known as the Porto Metro, and to use the corridor of the lines into Trindade station as part of this system. On 28 April 2001, Trindade station and the line as far as Senhora da Hora was closed, so that construction work could begin on the Porto Metro. The railway station was demolished, and Trindade metro station was built in its place. The metro line between Trindade, Senhora da Hora and Senhor de Matosinhos was inaugurated on 7 December 2002.
