= Linha de Guimarães =

Portuguese railway line

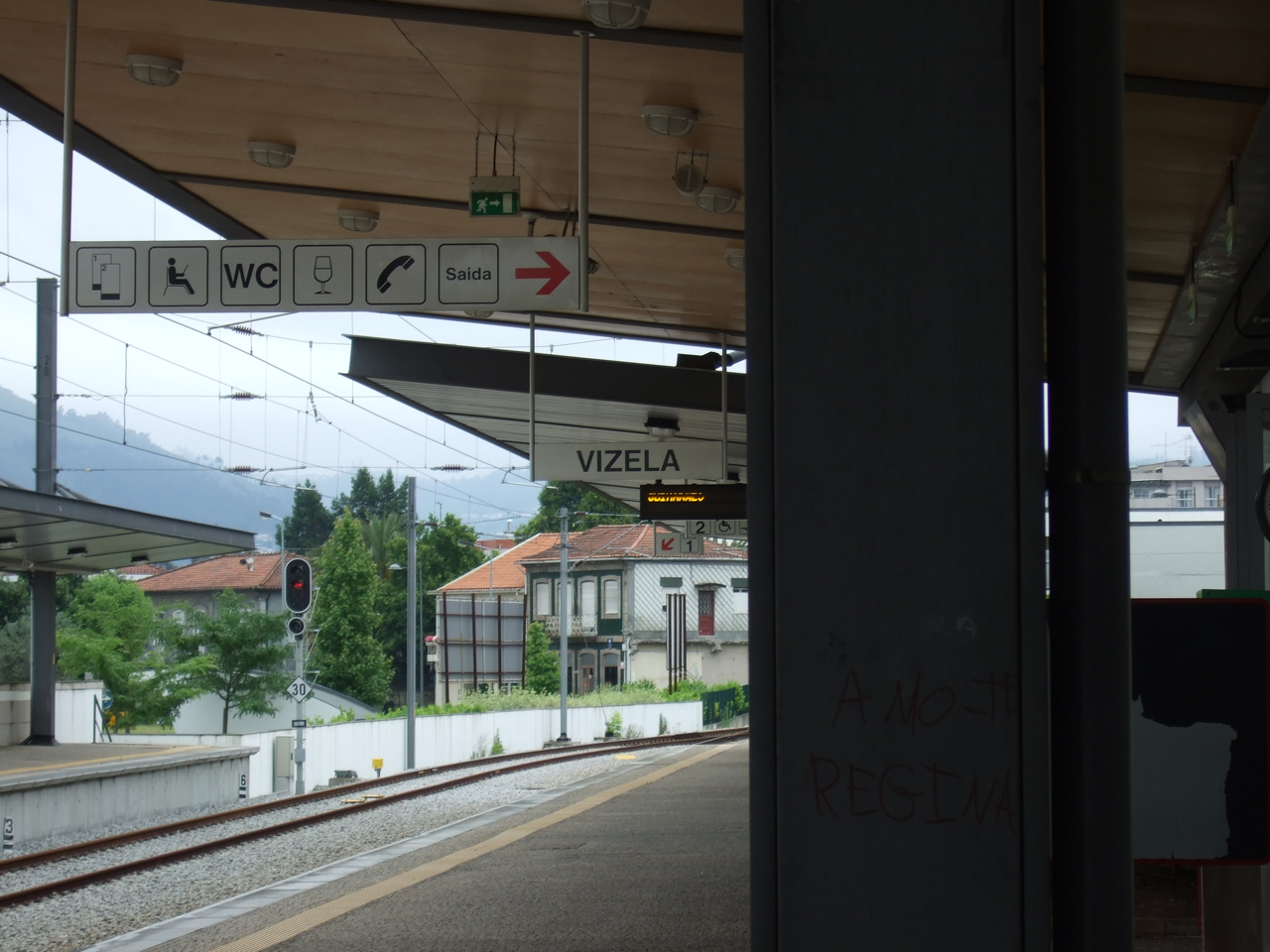
- Vizela railway station.

Overview
- Status: Operational
- Owner: Infraestruturas de Portugal
- Termini: Lousado; Guimarães

Service
- Operator(s): Comboios de Portugal

Technical
- Line length: ca 30 km (19 mi)
- Track gauge: 1,668 mm (5 ft 5 21/32 in)
- Old gauge: 1,000 mm (3 ft 3 3/8 in)
- Electrification: 25 kV / 50 Hz Overhead line, AC

The Linha de Guimarães (Guimarães railway line) is a railway line in Portugal operated by Comboios de Portugal, which runs between Porto and Guimarães. Until 1986 it extended eastwards to Fafe. It was extensively modernised in the 2000s, including conversion from metre gauge to Iberian gauge track and electrification.

Location on the network
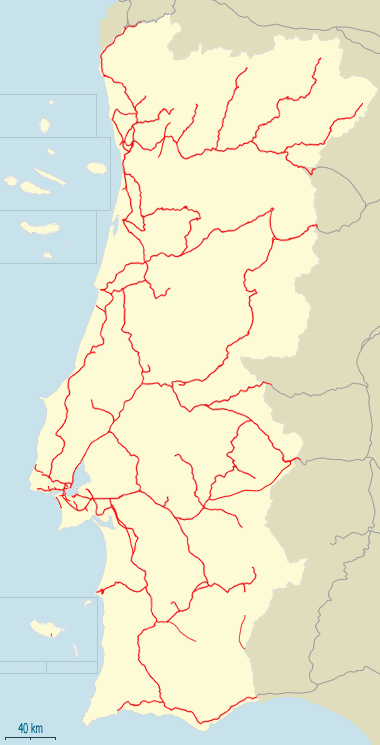

+ Lousado × Guimarães (🔎)

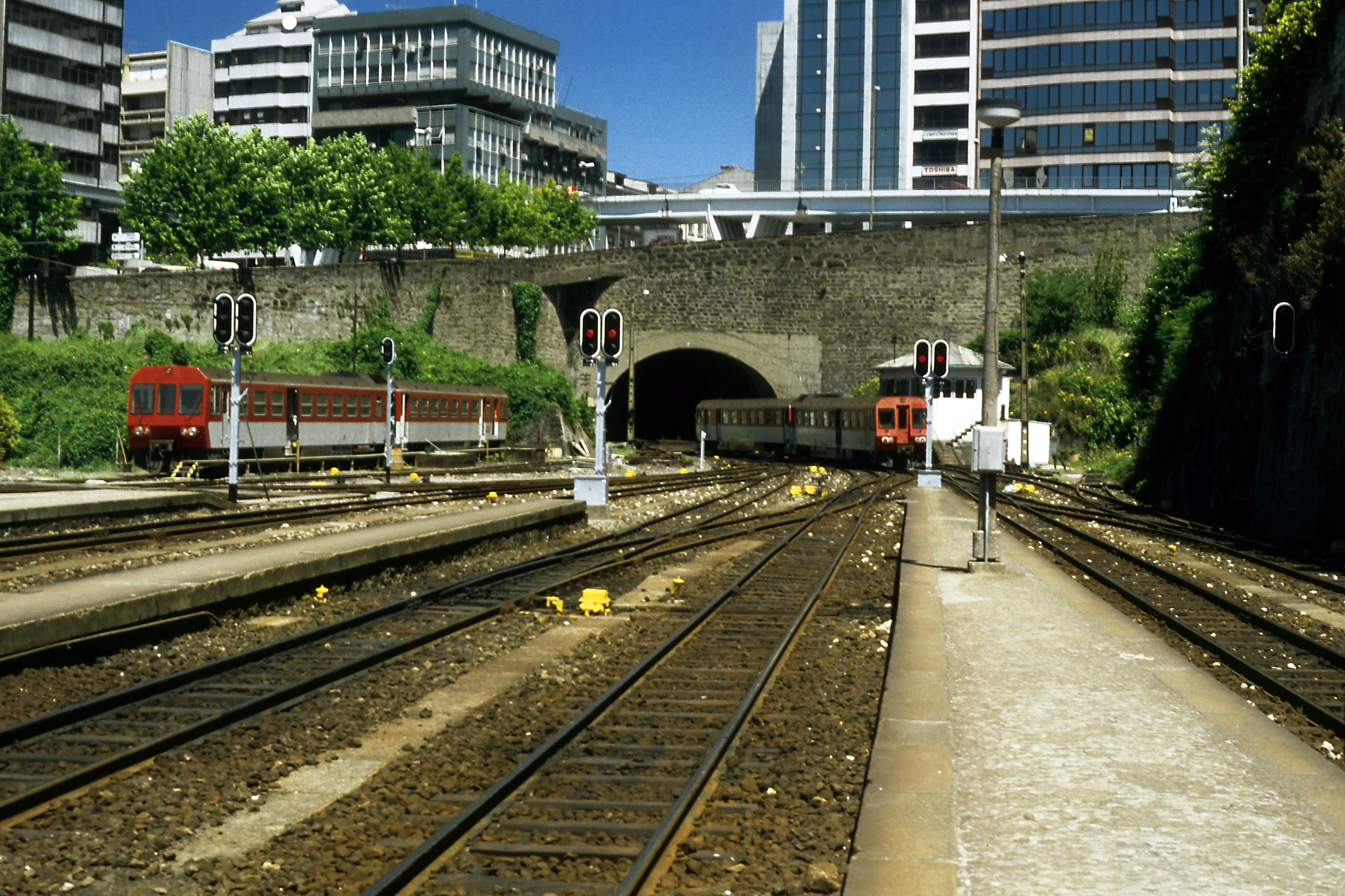
Trindade station, Porto, May 1996

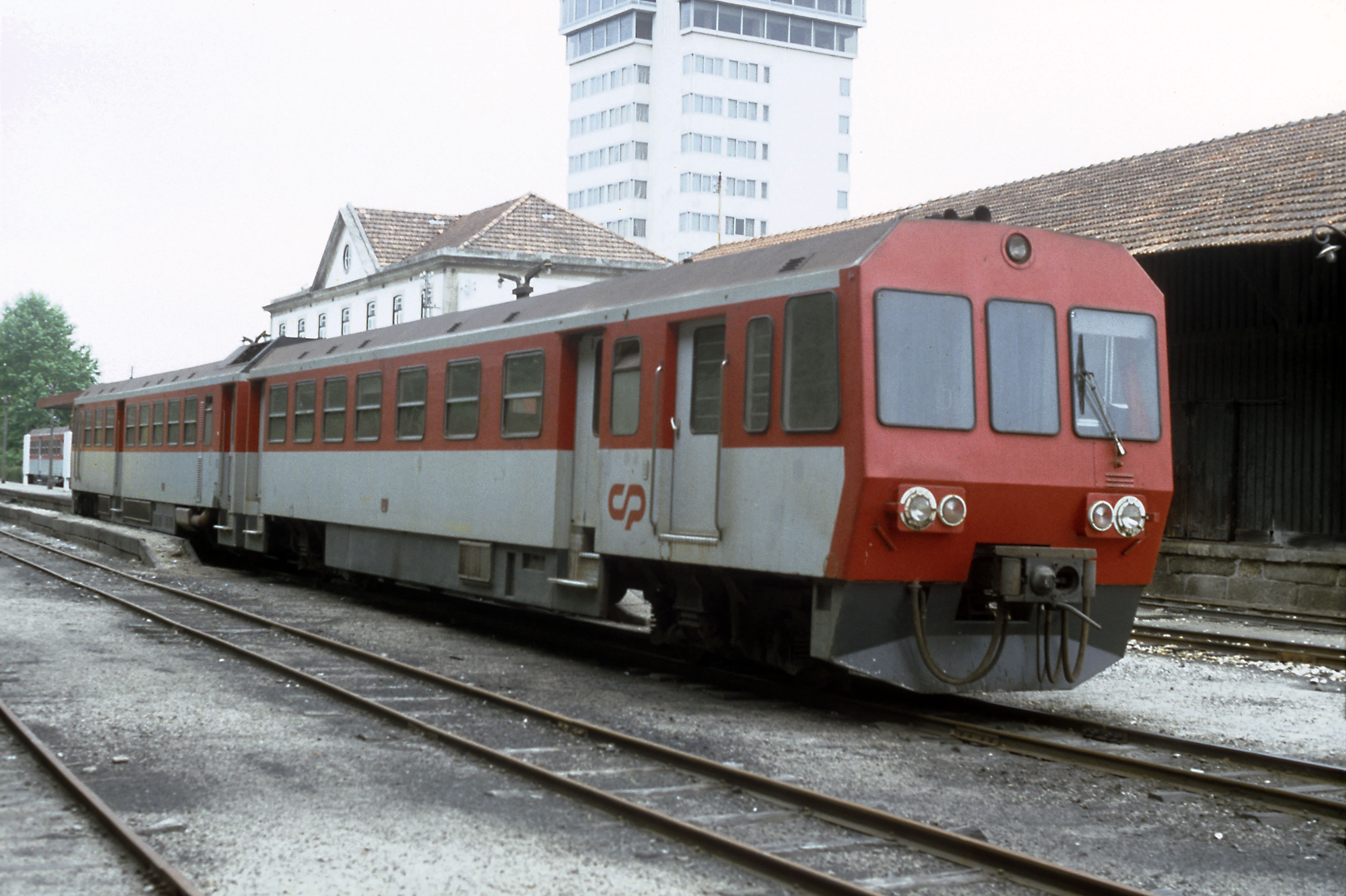
Narrow gauge diesel multiple unit train at Guimarães station in 1996

== Narrow gauge line ==
The first proposals for a railway to Guimarães were for the "CF Americano" in 1871, which would have linked Porto to Santo Tirso, Guimarães and Braga. The route would have followed the nationally maintained Royal Roads 32 and 27, but the scheme was unrealistic, and no progress was made. However, on 28 December 1872, an alternative was proposed, which would follow the Ave valley, and a concession to carry out surveys and construct the line was granted. The Linha do Minho, a broad gauge railway running northwards along the foothills and crossing the Ave River near Trofa had recently been opened, and the proposal was for a metre-gauge line which would diverge from the Linha do Minho near the river bridge and follow the valley eastwards to Guimarães, with a branch onwards to Fafe.

The government hoped that private enterprise would be keen to develop the railway network in the north of the country, but the remoteness of the regions on offer resulted in most entrepreneurs declining to proceed. The line to Guimarães was an exception, and an English company, the Minho District Railway Company, agreed to build the railway, with the concession being assigned to them on 18 February 1875. The company issued 26,000 shares, valued at £10 sterling each, of which most were bought be English investors, but Portuguese speculators bought 6,600 shares. The section from Guimarães to Fafe was expected to be difficult to construct, so the plans were amended to terminate at Guimarães, and to build the line as a broad-gauge railway, rather than metre-gauge. A contractor called Sandiforth Griffin started the work, but was soon replaced by John Dixon, who claimed to have completed the line to Santo Tirso, some 6 kilometres (3.7 mi) from the Ave bridge, in 1878, but the work was far from complete, and the Portuguese shareholders accused the company of deliberately defrauding them.

They then petitioned the Ministry of Public Works, succeeded in obtaining new powers to build a broad gauge line from Bougado to Guimarães, and the English company was declared to have defaulted on the project, allowing a new company to take over its assets. The Companhia de Guimarães was constituted in May 1880, and decided that a metre gauge railway was more appropriate given the terrain. They were granted a new concession on 18 August 1880, and a contract to construct the railway was awarded to Domingo Busquets of Barcelona in 1881. Despite optimism that the line would be open to Vizela by August 1882, the project was delayed by disputes with the English contractors, and Vizela was reached at the end of the year. It was not until 3 December 1883 that agreement was reached with the Estado, operators of the Minho line, for the junction at Lousada on the north bank of the Ave near Trofa.

An official opening for this section was held on 31 December 1883, when a party of people travelled from Porto Campanha station on a broad gauge train. At Trofa they changed to a narrow-gauge train, which ran along the mixed-gauge track to Lousado, arriving there at precisely 9:00am. The train continued along the new narrow gauge track, stopping at Santo Tirso, Negrellos, Lordelo and finally Vizela, where celebrations were held. The public opening took place on 1 January 1884, and the line was completed through to Guimarães on 14 April 1884. Anticipating that traffic would expand, the company bought a further two locomotives, ten coaches and 15 wagons during 1884 and 1885, with one of the locomotives arriving early enough to be used on the first train to Guimarães. There were some teething problems, with the company complaining to the contractor about the quality of the workmanship. A turntable was installed at Trofa soon afterwards, and because receipts were good, the company had enough money to build several carriage sheds, goods sheds and loading docks along the line. Their main workshop was based at Lousado.

=== Expansion ===
Unlike most of the other narrow gauge lines in Portugal, the Guimarães line was profitable, and generated sufficient income to regularly pay its shareholders a dividend of five to six percent. Fafe was around 22 kilometres (14 mi) to the east of Guimarães, and they started to plan an extension to the town. The first concession for the work was agreed in 1891, and on 1 August 1899 a final version was approved. The national plan for railways north of the Mondego River envisaged an extension even further, to Moneira de Rei and Cavez. Meanwhile, the company introduced a rolling programme of upgrading the track using heavier rails, as the originals were found to be too light. The mixed-gauge section was the first to benefit, in 1893, and the company managed to obtain some 1,500 lengths of nearly new rail together with 16 wagons from the CF de Torres Novas à Alcanena when it closed. Guimarães station was improved, with the construction of a quarter roundhouse for the locomotives and a large shed for the carriages. By 1898, the company had managed to cut its operating coefficient to just 31 percent, a figure so extraordinarily low that it received approving comment in the newspapers.

Progress on the Fafe extension was slow, but issues with the terms of the concession and with land purchase had been resolved by 14 May 1903, when the concession was approved. The money to fund the new section was raised in 1904, and Benito Corbal & Cia were awarded the contract for construction. The company bought enough rail to complete the extension and to upgrade the existing track from Lousado to Santo Tirso. There was a dispute with the contractors in 1906, and the company decided they would complete the work themselves. Construction of the 67-metre (73 yd) tunnel at Paço Viera was difficult, as the rock was unstable, but the work was finished and a formal opening took place on 20 July 1907, with public services starting on the following day. Existing motive power was supplemented by three 2-6-0T tank engines supplied by Kessler of Esslingen while four first class bogie coaches and various wagons were supplied by the French company Dyle et Bacalan.

From 1938 trains started operating the entirety of the route via a new link from Trindade station in Porto through to Fafe. The section between Guimarães and Fafe was closed in 1986 and the track lifted. Narrow gauge services on the Guimarães line ended in 2002 (for conversion to 1,668 mm / 5 ft 5 21/32 in). The terminus in Porto was Trindade station, which was closed in 2001 and subsequently rebuilt for use by the Porto Metro. The first few kilometres of the Guimarães line from Trindade has been rebuilt to become line C of the Porto Metro.

== Broad gauge line ==
In 2004 Guimarães was one of the venues for the UEFA Euro 2004 football championship. Considerable investment was needed to bring the Guimarães line up to modern standards for carrying the expected numbers of visitors. Accordingly, the line was completely rebuilt as a 1,668 mm (5 ft 5 21/32 in) gauge line, with 25 kV / 50 Hz overhead wire electrification. The former line east of Guimarães to Fafe remained closed.

Upon modernisation in 2004, the former Porto terminus at Trindade station was closed (and has since been completely rebuilt to become a station on the Porto Metro). The former section of line between Porto Trindade station and Lousado was closed; trains to/from Guimarães now operate between Lousado and Porto via the Linha do Minho. Most Guimarães trains now terminate at Porto São Bento.

== See also ==
- List of gauge conversions
- List of railway lines in Portugal
- List of Portuguese locomotives and railcars
- History of rail transport in Portugal

== Bibliography ==
- Davies, W J K (1998). Narrow Gauge Railways of Portugal. Plateway Press. ISBN 978-1-871980-35-6.
