= Linha do Porto à Póvoa e Famalicão =

Portuguese railway line

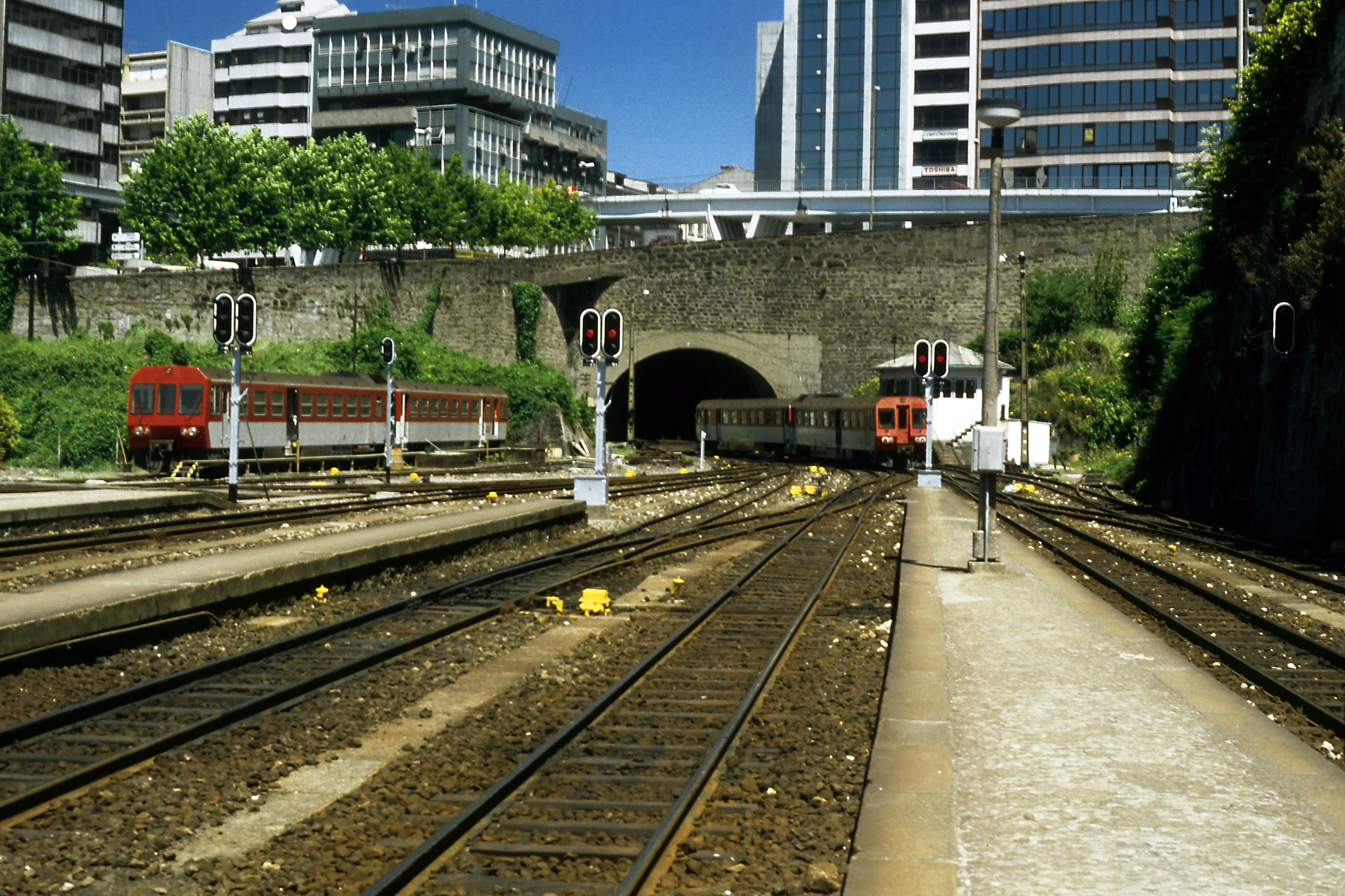
- Porto-Trindade railway station

Overview
- Other name(s): Porto to Póvoa and Famalicão railway line
- Status: Closed
- Termini: Porto-Trindade; Famalicão

Technical
- Line length: 57.1 km (35.5 mi)
- Track gauge: 1,000 mm (3 ft 3 3/8 in) metre gauge
- Old gauge: 900 mm (2 ft 11 7/16 in)
Route map
Location on the network

The Linha do Porto à Póvoa e Famalicão, or Porto to Póvoa and Famalicão railway line, was a railway line in Portugal, which connected the city of Porto to Senhora da Hora, Póvoa de Varzim and Famalicão to the city's north. The line was built to a gauge of 900 mm (2 ft 11 7/16 in), making it the first public narrow gauge railway in Portugal.

The line was constructed by the Companhia dos Caminhos de Ferro de Porto à Póvoa de Varzim e Familicão. The first section, from Porto to Senhora da Hora, opened on 1 October 1875, and the line reached Famalicão on 12 June 1881. As built, the line's Porto terminus was at Porto-Boavista station, which was rather inconveniently located on the edge of what was then the built-up area of Porto.

On 14 January 1927, the company of the Porto to Póvoa and Famalicão line was merged with that of the Guimarães line, a 1,000 mm (3 ft 3 3/8 in) gauge line to the north-east of Porto, thus forming the Norte de Portugal company. This resulted in the conversion of the line to Póvoa and Famalicão to 1000mm gauge, and the construction of a link line from Senhora da Hora to Trofa, which connected with the Guimarães line. Opened in 1932, this allowed through trains to run from Guimarães to Porto for the first time.

Despite Boavista's inconvenient location, it remained the company's city terminus until 1938, when the line was extended to the newly built and more centrally located Porto-Trindade station.

In 1995, the section between Póvoa de Varzim and Famalicão was closed. Between 2001 and 2002, railway services came to an end in the remainder of the line, as it was converted into Line B of the Porto Metro, a light rail system.

== See also ==
- List of railway lines in Portugal
- History of rail transport in Portugal
