= Porto Tram Museum =

Tram museum in Portugal

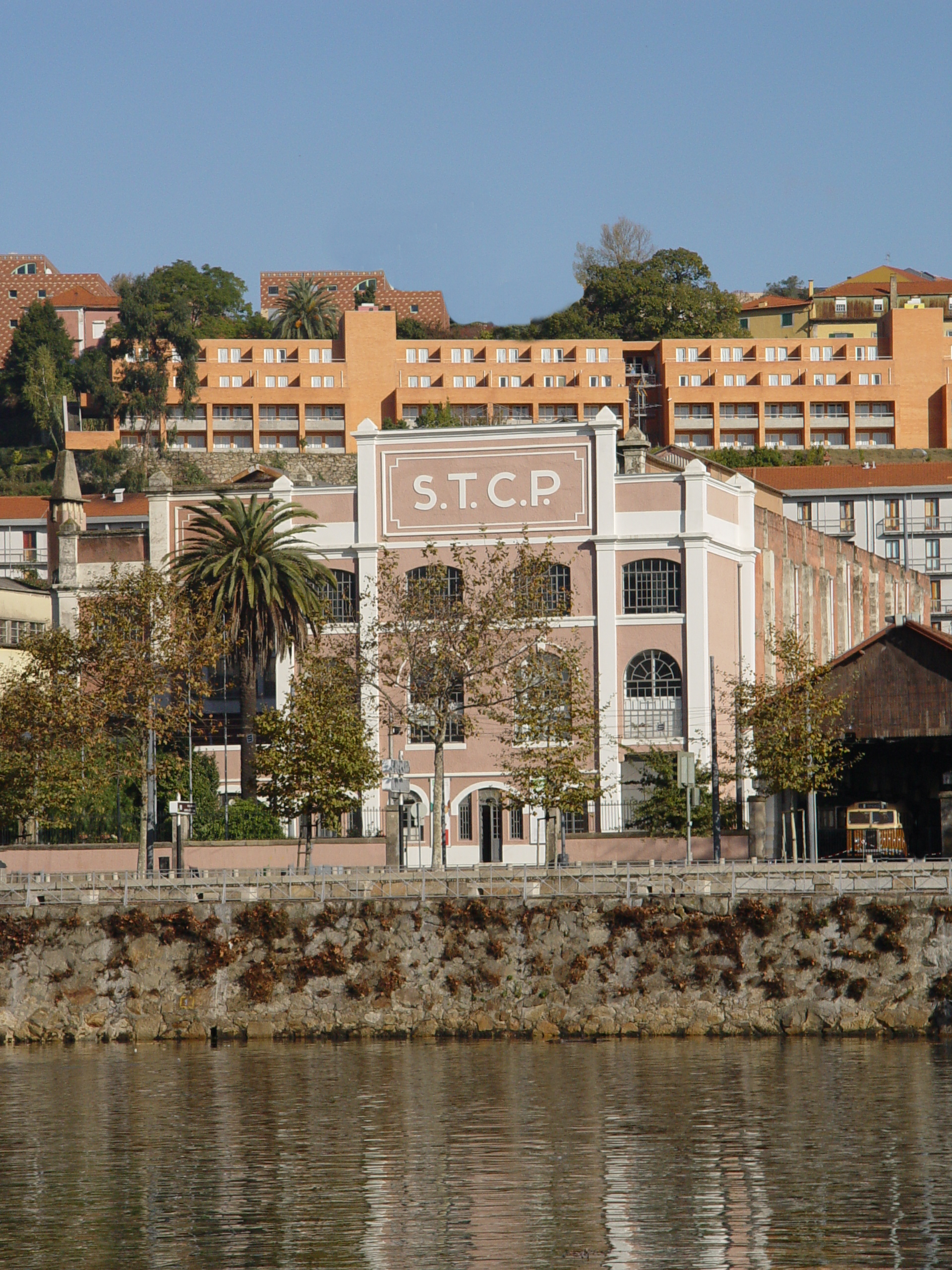
- Established: 1992; 33 years ago
- Location: Alameda de Basílio Teles 51; 4150-127 Porto, Portugal
- Coordinates: 41.147706°N 8.632836°W
- Website: http://www.museudocarroelectrico.pt/default.aspx

The Porto Tram Museum (Museu do Carro Eléctrico) is a museum operated by the Sociedade de Transportes Colectivos do Porto. It was inaugurated in 1992 and is installed in a former thermoelectric power station next to the River Douro in Massarelos, Porto, Portugal. It exhibits material related to the history of trams in Porto. The collection contains 16 electric cars, 5 trailers, and two maintenance vehicles as well as the former equipment of the power plant, which provided electricity for the tram lines.

== The building ==
The construction of the building as a power plant was completed in 1915. It consists of two large halls that were, respectively, the hall for the steam generators (boilers) and the engine room. Until the 1940s the power station produced enough energy to power the tram network. However, with the increase in the number of electric cars in circulation, the trams became partially dependent on the city's power supply and in the 1960s energy production at the plant ceased, although it continues to operate as a substation for the three remaining tram lines. The museum was opened on the site in May 1992. One hall of the building houses the trams and the other the electrical equipment. An additional shed houses the trams that are still used on a daily basis. The museum closed in December 2012, re-opening in November 2015 after repairs costing around one million Euros.

== The collection ==
The museum's collection consists of the following cars. A parade of many of the cars in the collection is held in Porto annually.

- Trailer Car 1. This car was built by the local company "A Constructora" in 1909 and has Brill-23D bogies. It was the first of a class of seven.
- Trailer Car 8. This is a horse-drawn tram purchased from Starbuck Car and Wagon Company of Birkenhead, England. This type of vehicle was first used in Porto on May 15, 1872. It has also been used as a trailer for steam and electric engines.

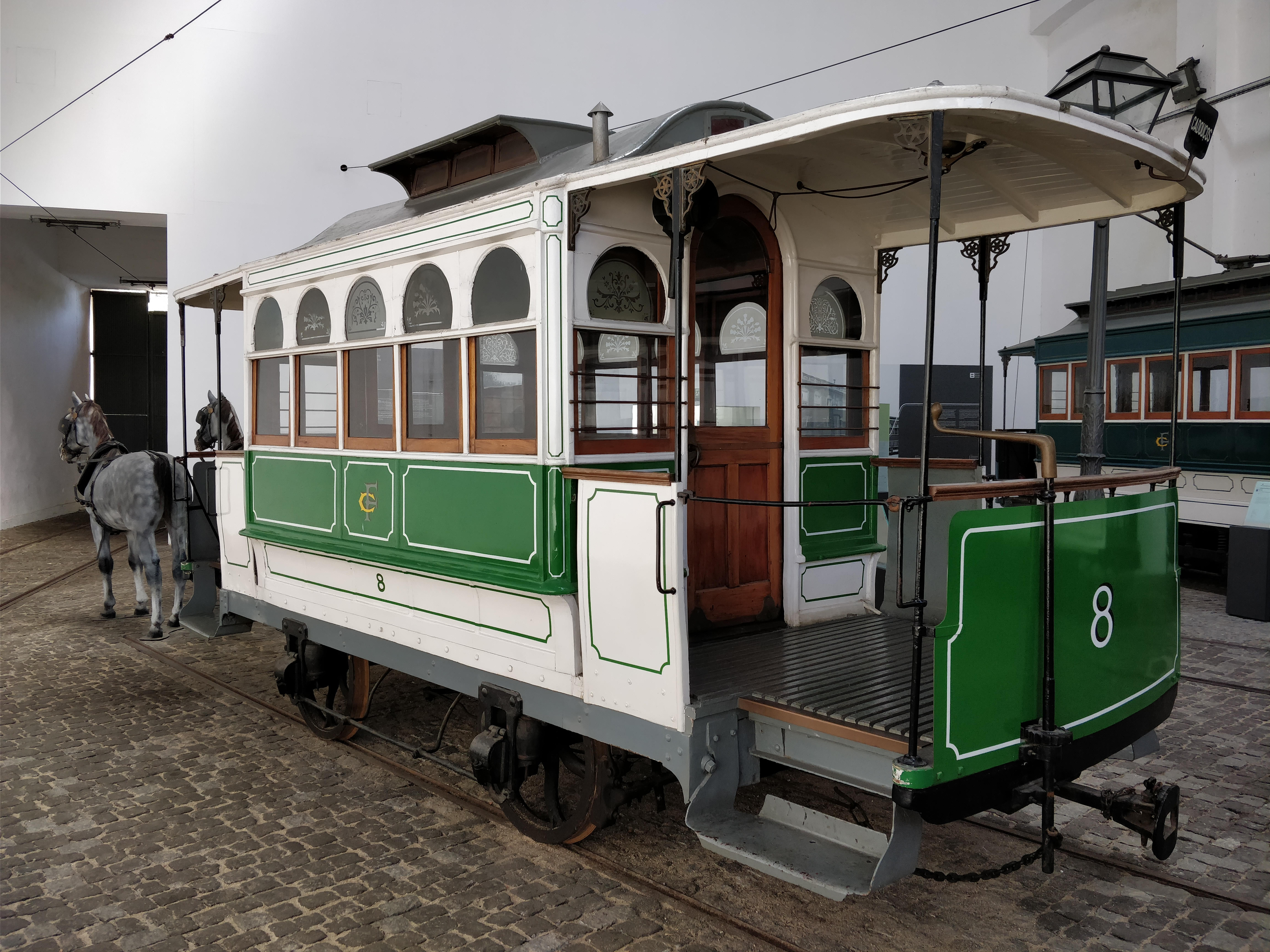
Tram Number 8

- Trailer Car 18. This was built in the workshops of Companhia Carris de Ferro do Porto in 1934, and was used until the 1960s. Its windows were removed in the summer months, allowing smoking in the inside, which gave it the name of "smoker".
- Trailer Car 25. This vehicle was designed as a trailer and built in the workshops of the Sociedade de Transportes Colectivos do Porto in 1947. However it was completed as an electric tram with the number 400 as part of the class 400-404. Only one tram of this type was completed and used as trailer with the number 28, to be converted to an electric tram (no.405) too in 1949. After withdrawal tram no.400 became part of the museum collection and was converted into trailer no.25.
- Electric Car 22. This tram is of the type of mule tramcars / steamtram trailers that was used to be transformed into the first Porto electric trams in 1895. This first trams of this type used in Porto were built in 1874 by the Starbuck Car and Wagon Company. Later the workshops of the tram company and the local company A Constructora built this type too, the last ones built in 1900. This vehicle was an electric car until 1946, then converted into a trailer with the number 22. It was restored into an electric tram in 1992 according to its original design.
- Electric Car 100. This is a 1995 replica of a vehicle built in the first decade of the 20th century, which was destroyed in a large fire at Boavista station in Porto in February 1928. This, and car No. 104, can be hired for social events.
- Electric Car 104. This vehicle is a replica with the characteristics of an electric car that circulated initially as a mule tram / steamtram trailer but, after around 1903, was motorized. It was used until the late 1950's. The construction of the replica was done in 1994.
- Electric Car 163. This car features characteristics similar to those of the cars that were produced by American companies like J. G. Brill Company. However the tram was one of a class of 24 built by the local company A Constructora in 1904-1906 with the use of Brill made 21E trucks.
- Electric Car 247. This car was known by the name of "English car" because it was manufactured by the British United Electric Car Company of Preston. It was acquired by Companhia Carris de Ferro do Porto in 1909 and underwent several changes that removed some of its original characteristics.

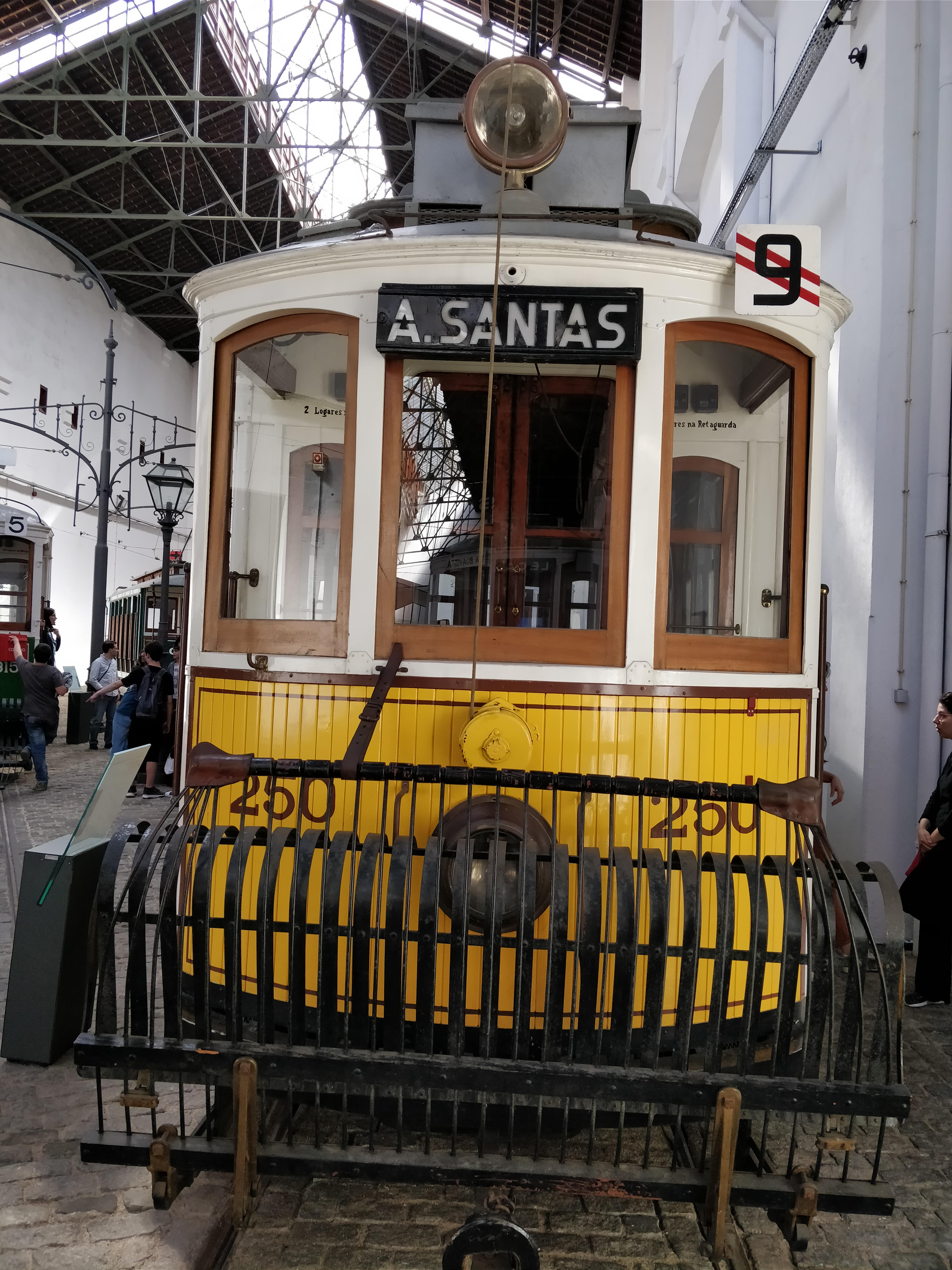
Tram Number 250

- Electric Car 250. This car belonged to a series of 12 vehicles built in the workshops of Companhia Carris de Ferro do Porto in 1926-1928. Circulating until 1981 these vehicles were later called "Italian cars" because in the 1950's they were equipped with motors of the Compagnia Generale di Elettricità in Italy.
- Electric Car 267. This vehicle was built in the workshops of Companhia Carris de Ferro do Porto in 1931. Its windows were also removed during the summer months, allowing smoking inside.
- Electric Car 269. This car was built in the workshops of Companhia Carris de Ferro do Porto in 1931 and circulated until the 1990s.
- Electric Car 274. This car was built in the Workshops of Companhia Carris de Ferro do Porto in 1928. This vehicle is a copy of the first “Brill” car.
- Electric Car 288. This vehicle belonged to a series of 10 electric cars that were acquired by Companhia Carris de Ferro do Porto from the Belgian company "Societé Anonyme des Ateliers de Construction d'Etablissements Famileureux" in 1928. Therefore, the cars of this series became known as the "Belgian cars".
- Electric Car No. 315. This car belonged to a series of 16 cars, numbered from 300 to 315, built in the workshops of Companhia Carris de Ferro do Porto between 1929 and 1930.
- Electric Car 373. The electric cars of this series were designed and manufactured in the workshops of the Companhia Carris de Ferro do Porto between the years 1947 and 1952.
- Electric Car 500. This car was designed and built in the workshops of the Sociedade de Transportes Colectivos do Porto in 1951. This vehicle was the prototype of a series of cars that never were built. Its technical innovations included providing greater comfort to passengers and improved braking.
- Hansa-Lloyd Tower Car (green). This car, for the repair of the overhead lines, was acquired in Germany in 1929 by Companhia Carris de Ferro do Porto. It allowed a greater flexibility in the repair of the cables, providing an alternative to the cars previously used for this type of repair.
- Hansa-Lloyd Tower Car (grey). This was also acquired in 1929.

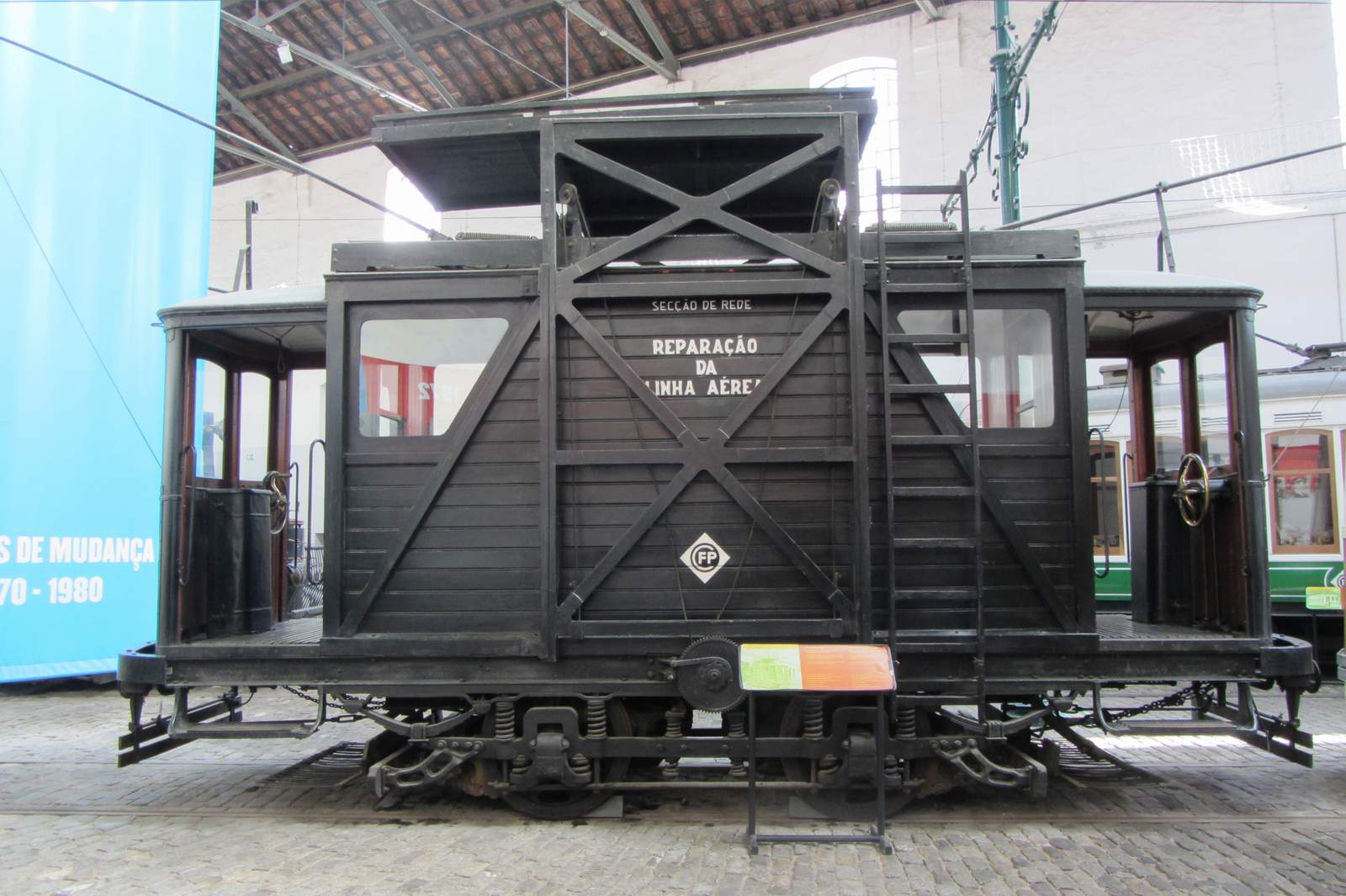
Car Tower repair wagon 49

- Car Tower Wagon 49. This electric repair car was built by Companhia Carris de Ferro do Porto in 1932. Equipped with a manual lift platform and a small workshop, it was intended to make minor repairs to the overhead lines and to electric cars while they were in service in the city.
- Wagon 80. This type of wagon was used for the transportation of fish. It was used on a route between the harbour of Leixões in Matosinhos where the fish was landed and the markets of Porto. It was towed by the trams that carried the fishmongers.
- Zorra 58. Since 1910, this type of open electric freight trams was used by the Companhia Carris de Ferro do Porto to transport all kind of goods, but mainly coal from the mines of S. Pedro da Cova and the coal storage of Monte Aventino, to the power plant at Massarelos and other users of coal. Originally the platforms were open like with zorra no.66.
- Zorra 66. This open electric freight tram is equal to no.58 but for the museum the platforms were made open again as they were originally. In case of exposure to rain the tram driver had with to wear a large cloak, wide-brimmed hat, rubber boots and insulated gloves to protect him from water and contact with electricity.
- Break-down assistance car 76. This electric car was one of a small series of closed freight cars likely built during the first decade of the 20th century. In its interior it has a repair workshop. If on-site repairs failed it was able to tow the electric cars back to the depot.
- Grinder car 48. This car was used to grind the track and make minor repairs on the road. Despite the various changes that it has undergone, it remains in line with the original, with two water tanks and a manually operated emery grinder. The current body however is of the same type as museum tram no.163 and built by the local company A Constructora around 1905. In 1964 this body replaced an older body.
