= Funicular dos Guindais =

Guindais Funicular
- Funicular dos Guindais
- Interactive map of the Guindais Funicular area

General information
- Type: Funicular
- Location: Cedofeita, Santo Ildefonso, Sé, Miragaia, São Nicolau e Vitória, Porto, Portugal
- Coordinates: 41°8′27.6″N 8°36′34.2″W
- Opened: 1891-1893, 2004
- Owner: Portuguese Republic

Design and construction
- Architect: Raoul Mesnier du Ponsard

Renovating team
- Architect: Adalberto Dias

Website
- http://www.metrodoporto.pt

The Guindais Funicular (Portuguese: Funicular dos Guindais) is a funicular railway in the Portuguese city of Porto. It connects the Praça da Batalha, situated uphill to the north, with Cais dos Guindais, by the riverside to the south. The upper station is by the terminus of the vintage tram line 22 and within walking distance of São Bento station for metro and railway connections. The lower station is by the lower level of the Dom Luís I Bridge and within walking distance of the Praça da Ribeira.

The modern funicular opened in 2004 and it runs along the same path of a funicular that briefly operated during the 19th century. It runs alongside the remains of the Fernandine Walls.

== History ==
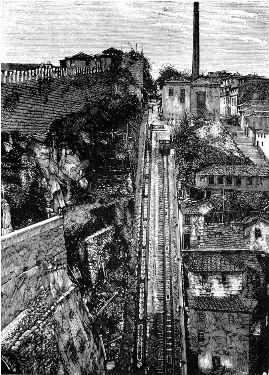
A drawing of the since abandoned funicular tracks along the Muralha das Freiras in 1891

The original line of the Guindais Funicular was designed to overcome the steep incline between Porto's riverside area and the higher elevations, where the population was concentrated. Established in July 1887, the Parceria dos Elevadores do Porto commissioned engineer Raul Mesnier to develop the project. Authorization for construction was granted on February 17, 1891, and the funicular commenced operations on June 4 of the same year. The funicular spanned 412 meters horizontally and ascended 80 meters, featuring gradients of 49% and 7%. It utilized a wire cable traction system driven by steam-powered engines. The funicular operated daily from 05:00 to 23:00, with fares ranging from 20 to 60 reals, and also transported goods such as bundles and packages.

Prior to its inauguration, extensive tests were conducted to ensure public safety. These tests included inspections of the machinery, materials, and rolling stock, as well as trials to verify the strength of the traction cables, the power of the machines, and the effectiveness of the braking systems. The evaluation committee confirmed that the Guindais Funicular was safe for public operation, and it began operating on 4 June 1891. However, on 5 June 1893, a serious accident occurred resulting in a loose car crashing into the lower platform at the Dom Luís I Bridge. Despite the dramatic nature of the incident, there were no fatalities. The driver was injured but survived, while a child on board escaped with minor injuries. Though the company intended to reopen the funicular after the accident, the adverse conditions following the financial crisis of 1891 prevented this.

The former powerhouse ("House") of the funicular railway hosted an atelier operated by sculptor Henrique Moreira. In 1993, it was remodeled to function as a meeting hall for local Jehovah's Witnesses.

In 2004, the Guindais Funicular was remodeled by architect Adalberto Dias. It opened on February 19, three years later than initially planned. The new funicular had been projected to open in 2001, when Porto was a European Capital of Culture. The new funicular aimed to attract both tourists and locals and in its first month of operations recorded over 23,000 validations.

== Architecture ==
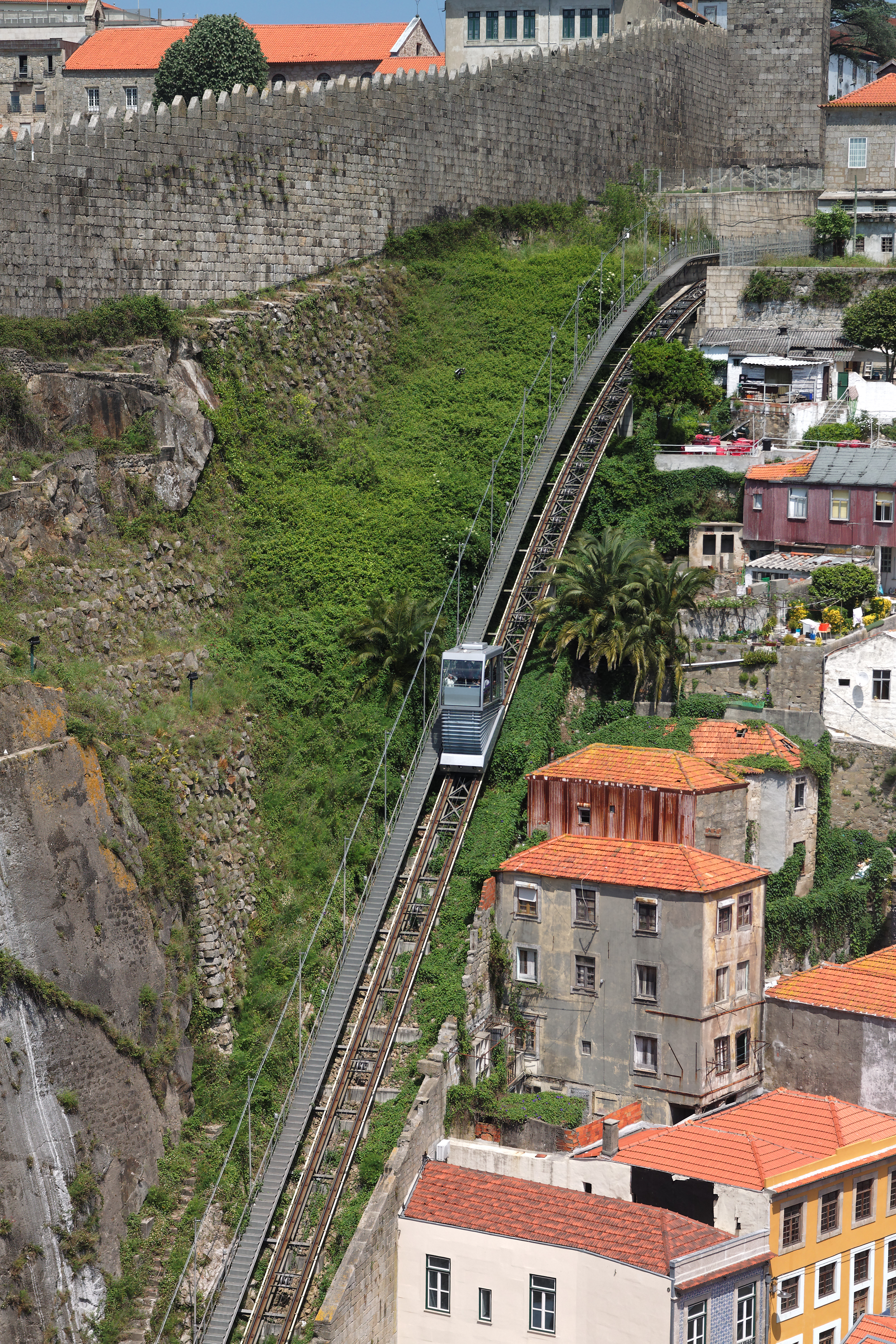
The modern funicular in 2011

=== Current design ===
The funicular is situated along the wall of Freiras, running down a steep cliff between the quay at Guindais and Rua da Batalha (terminating at building of the Civil Governor). The station in Batalha hosts the drive unit, while the station in Ribeira houses the counterweight system.

The single-track funicular uses a central loop system that is 281 metres (922 ft) long, allowing it to descend 61 metres (200 ft), with the upper 90 metres (295 ft) situated within a tunnel. The track's rail gauge is 1,200 millimetres (4 ft) and it features varying gradients, reaching a maximum incline of 36.1% below the passing loop and a minimum incline of 2.8% Two vehicles run the course, with a capacity for 25 persons each, operating at a maximum speed of 5 metres per second (16 ft/s). Due to the difference in slope along the line, the cars have self-leveling platforms, allowing the car floor to maintain itself horizontal no matter the track incline. The funicular does not require a driver onboard the vehicles and is instead operated from a control and surveillance station in Batalha.

The journey takes approximately 2 minutes and 30 seconds and after emerging from the upper tunnel, passengers are able to view from panoramic cabins the landscape of the Dom Luís I Bridge and the Douro River margins.

=== Original design ===
The 1891-1893 funicular covered a horizontal distance of 412 metres (1,352 ft) and overcame a height of 80 metres (262 ft), featuring a gradient of 49% over one-third of the route and 7% over the remainder. A curved transition connected these gradients, utilizing a secondary parallel line to balance the weight of vehicles on the steep section, thereby reducing the effort required by the machinery (see box). The car on the secondary line also carried passengers and cargo.

The funicular operated using a wire cable traction system, driven by steam-powered engines. The design included dual-cylinder high-pressure machines, capable of lifting fully loaded vehicles even without the assistance of a counterweight. The steam boilers were oil-fired TenBrink type, ensuring efficient operation with minimal smoke output.

The system also incorporated two distinct types of brakes: one for rapid speed reduction in case of a malfunction and another for immobilization. In the event of cable failure, the braking system would engage automatically to prevent derailment.

== Operations ==
The funicular is managed by a municipal company called STCP Serviços, a subsidiary of STCP and operated by LIFTECH. It was initially managed and operated by the Porto Metro, between 2004 and 2019, and by the Porto municipality between 2019 and 2022.

It runs every 10 minutes in each direction and can transport up to 25 passengers. Priority passengers are given priority access to both the ticket booth and vehicle. During the summer, the funicular operates from 08:00 to 00:00 on Fridays and Saturdays, and from 08:00 to 22:00 on other days. In the winter, hours are reduced by two hours each day. Schedules may vary during holidays.

Tickets can be bought on site, with discounts offered to children 4 to 12 years old and schools and on joint purchase for tickets for Elevador da Lada. The Andante ticket cannot be used on the funicular, with the exception of monthly pass carriers, who can travel for free. For visitors, the funicular provides an alternative to walking the steep streets between Porto's riverside and the upper city.

== Gallery ==
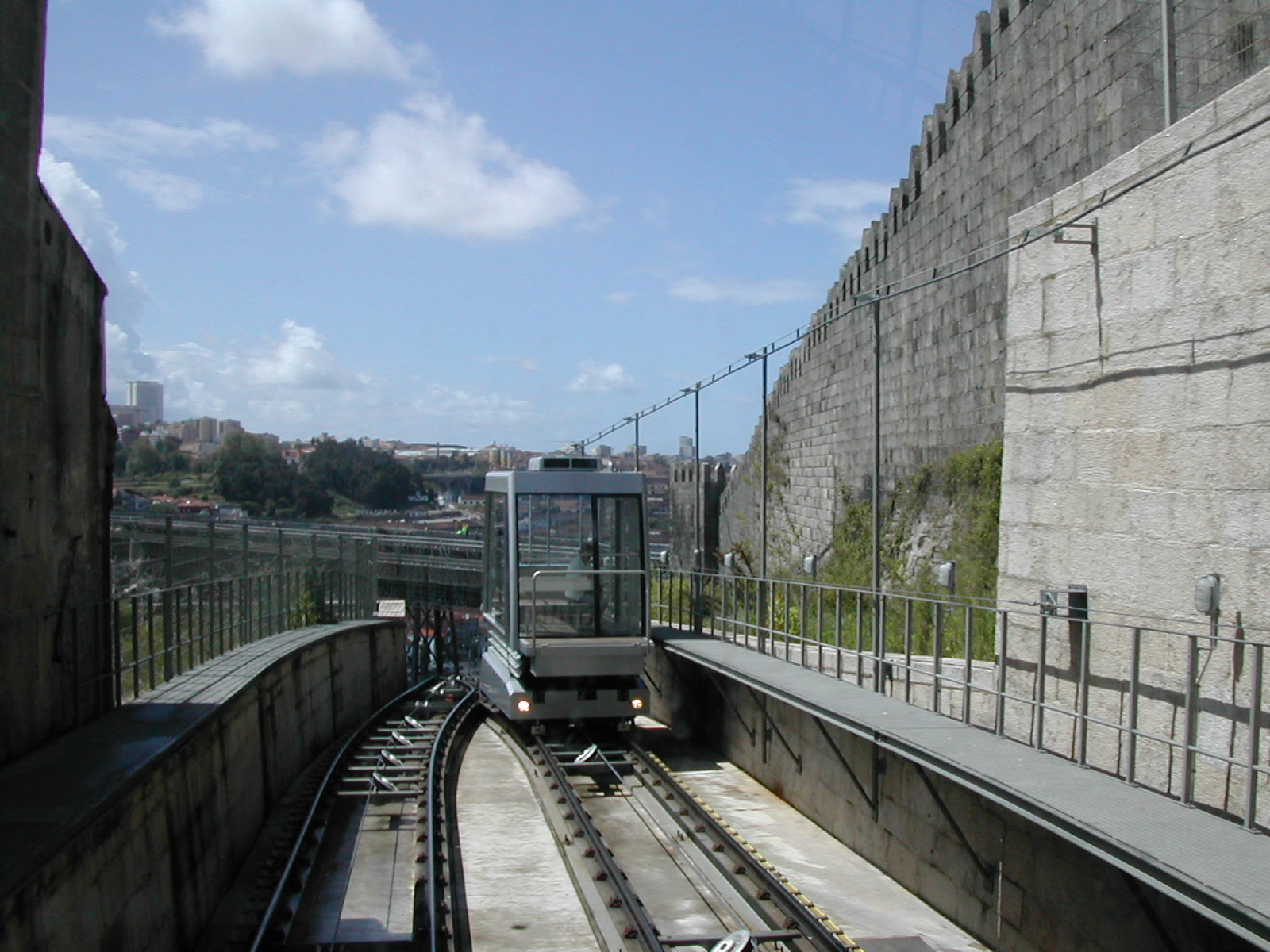
Car at the passing loop

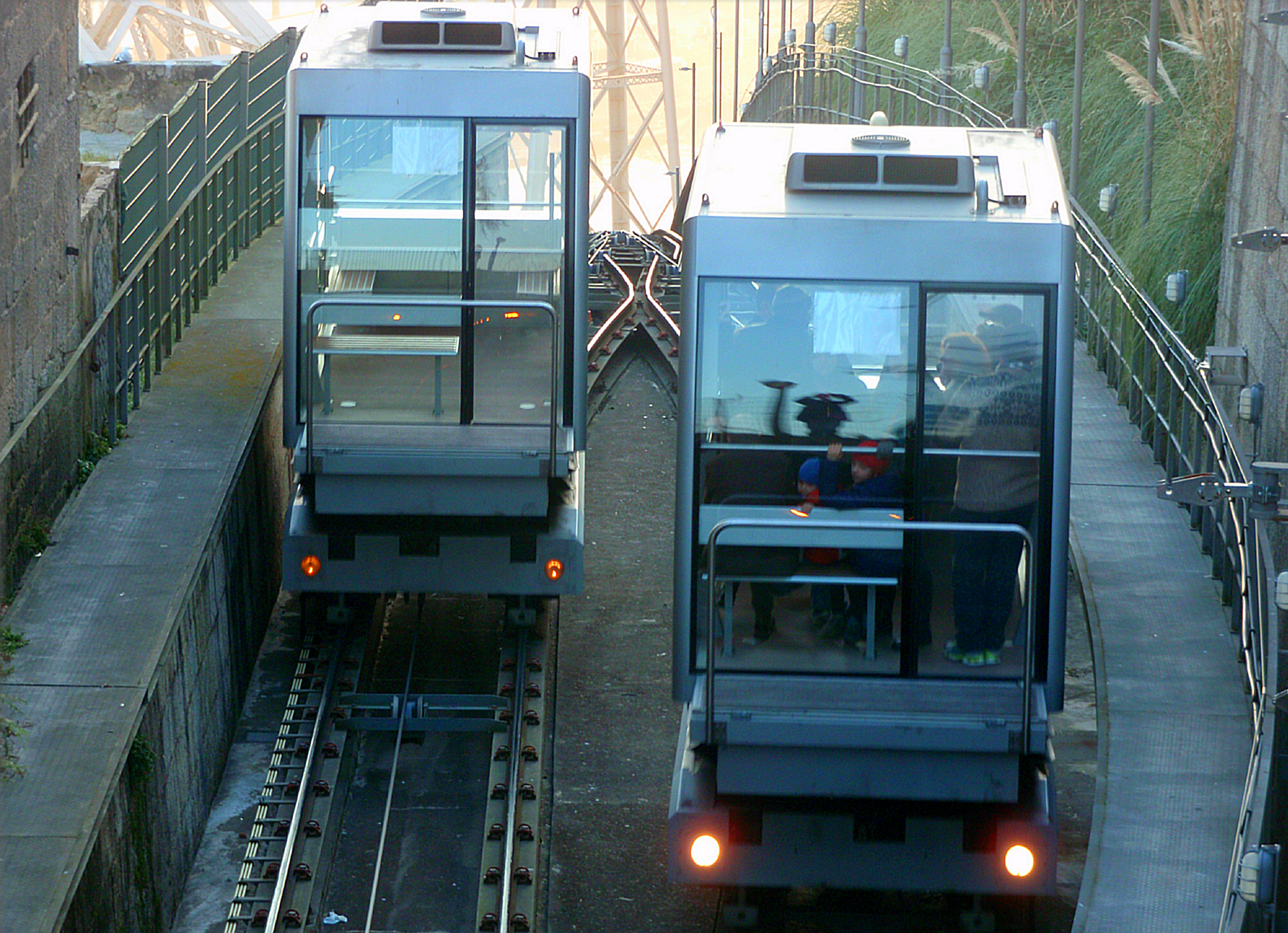
The funicular cars as they reach the passing loop

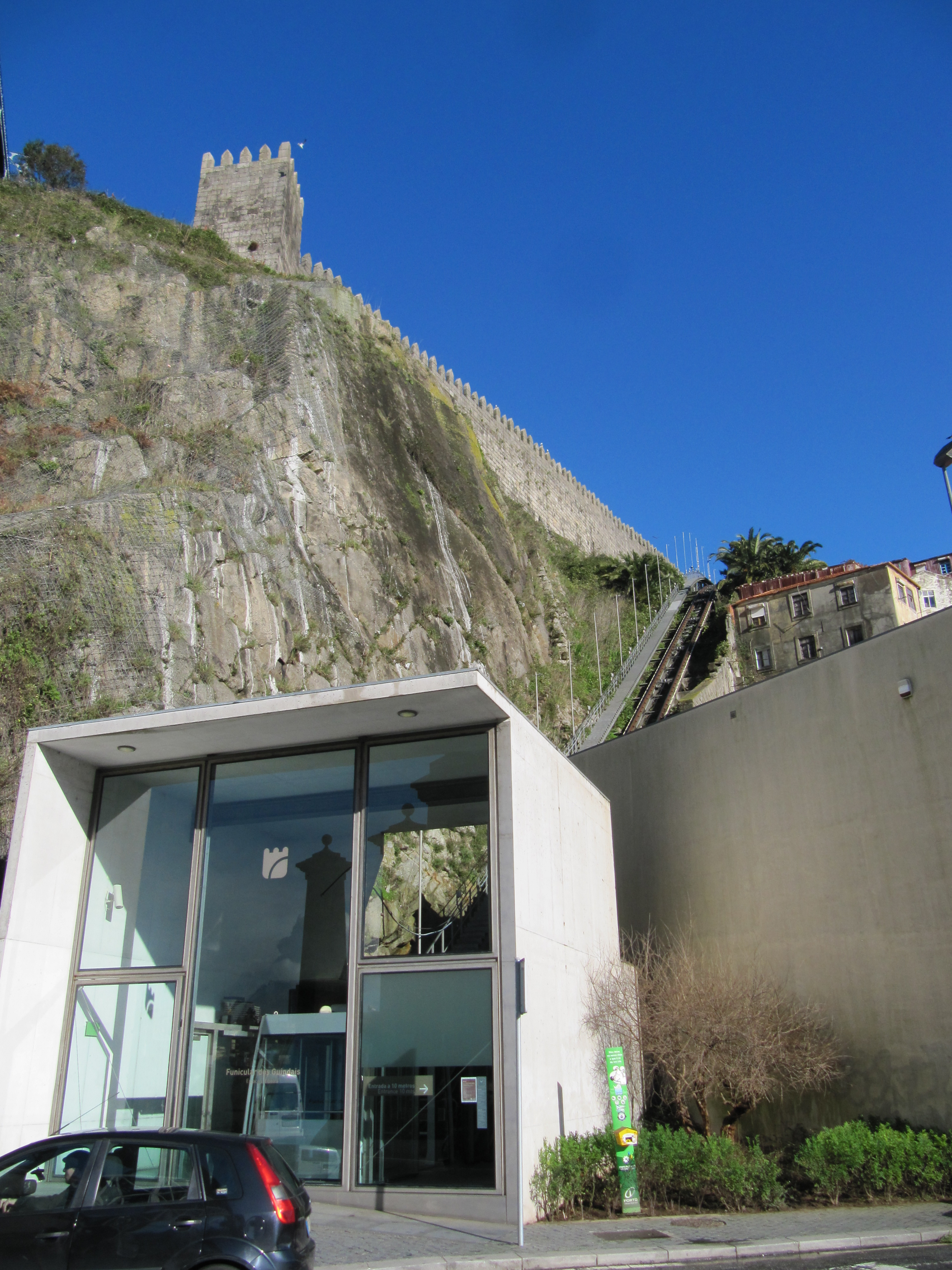
The lower station

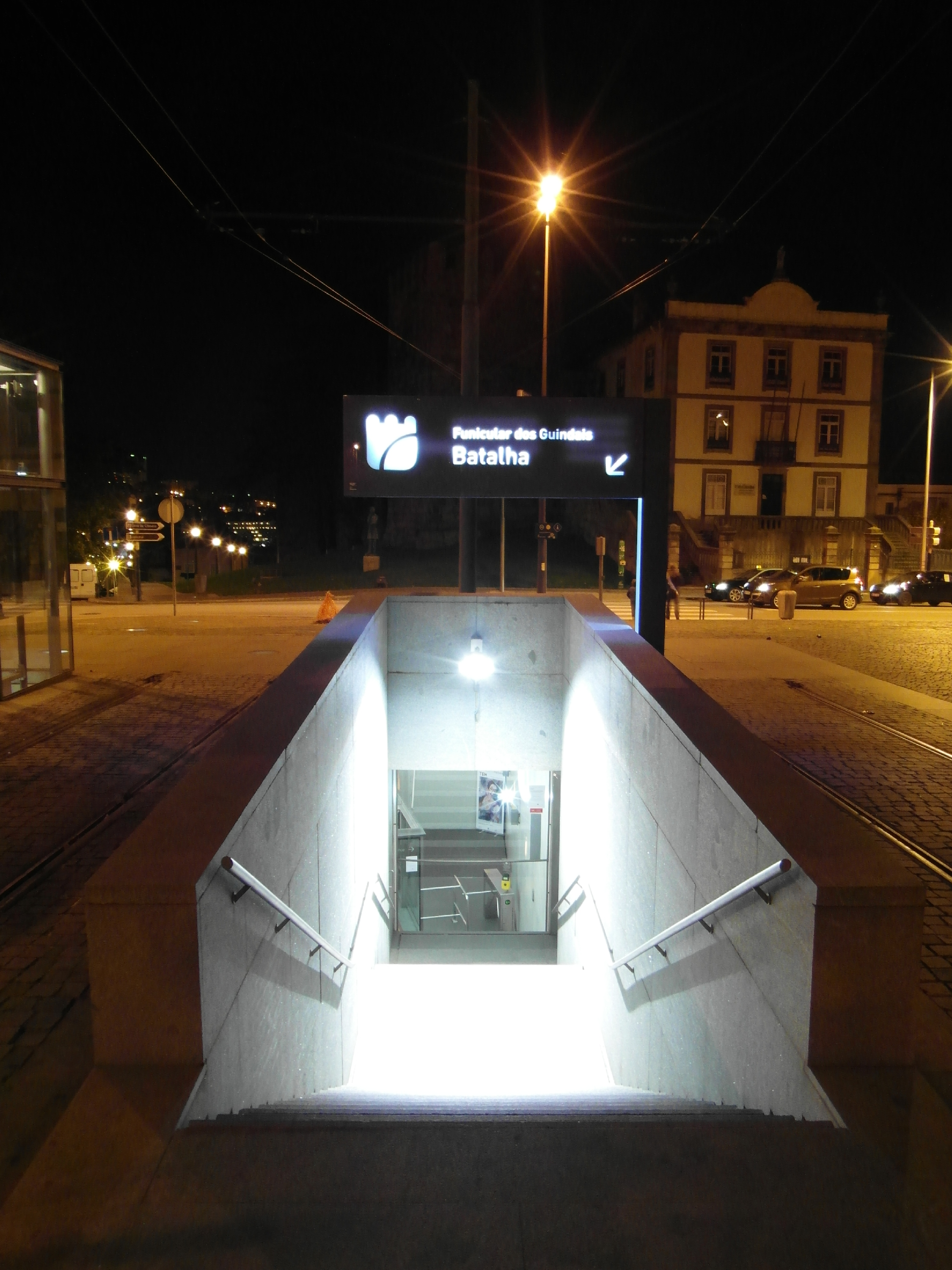
The upper station

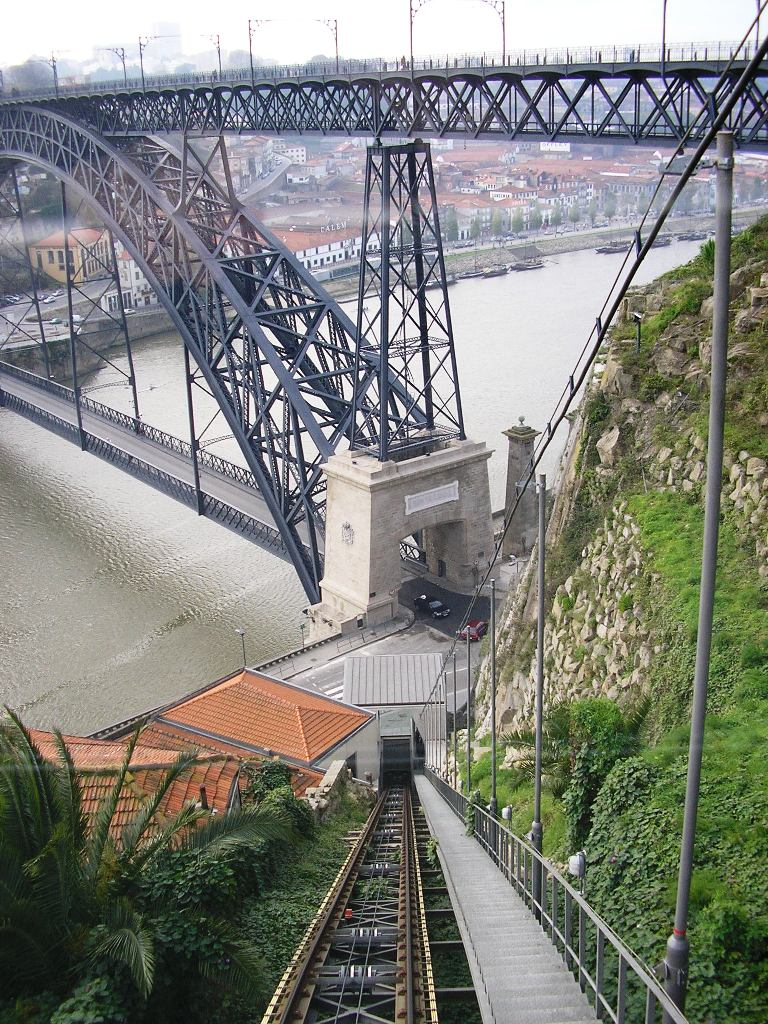

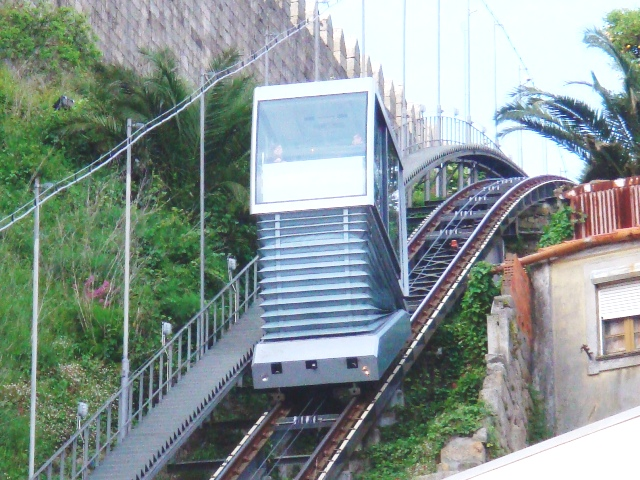
A close up of a car in extended mode

== See also ==
- List of funicular railways
- Porto Metro
- Trams in Porto
