= Trolley pole =

Device allowing a tram to collect current from overhead wires

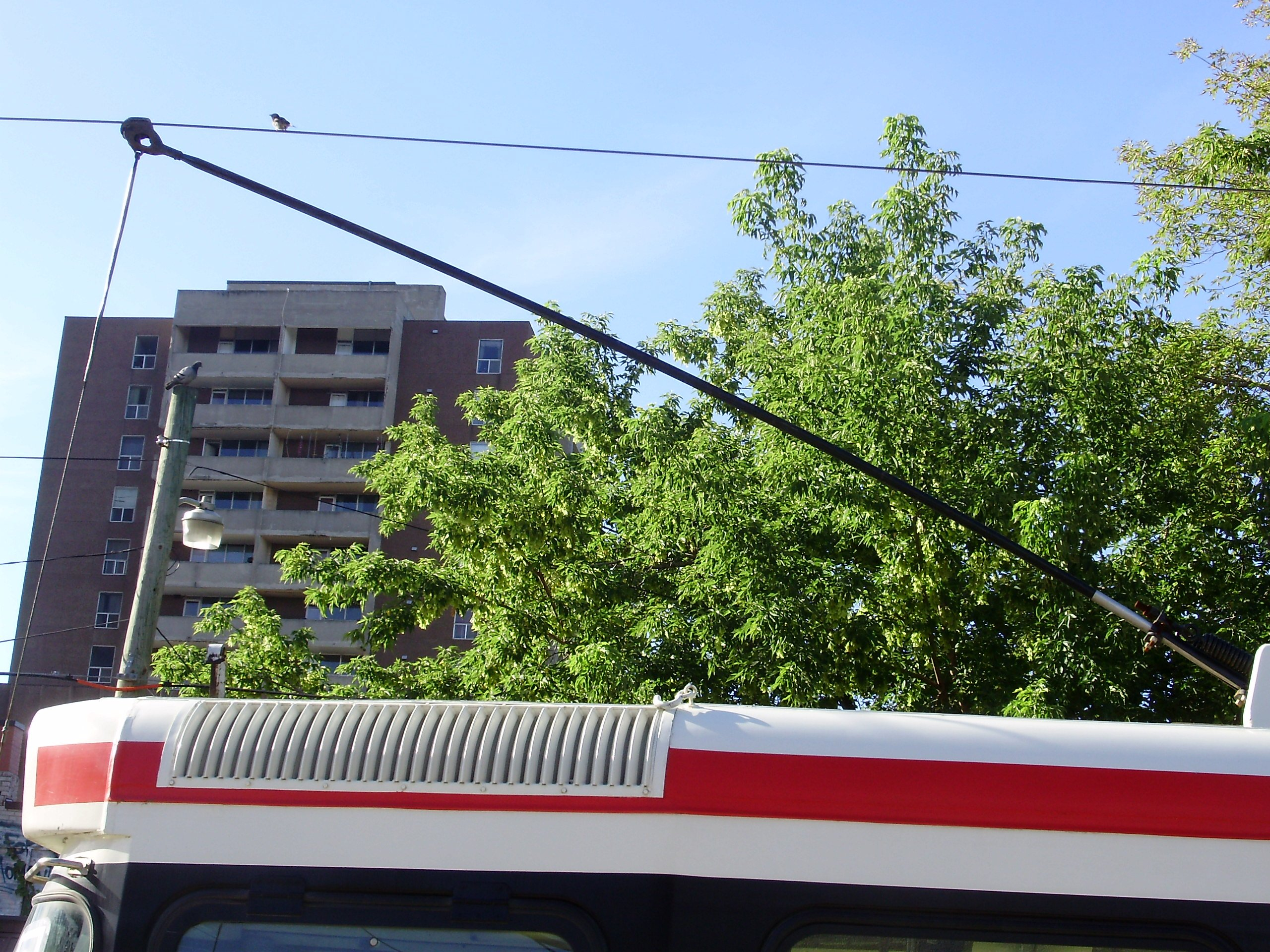
Trolley pole on a Toronto streetcar, tipped with a trolley shoe

A trolley pole is a tapered cylindrical pole of wood or metal, used to transfer electricity from a "live" (electrified) overhead wire to the control and the electric traction motors of a tram or trolley bus. It is a type of current collector. The use of overhead wire in a system of current collection is reputed to be the 1880 invention of Frank J. Sprague, but the first working trolley pole was developed and demonstrated by Charles Van Depoele, in autumn 1885.

== History ==
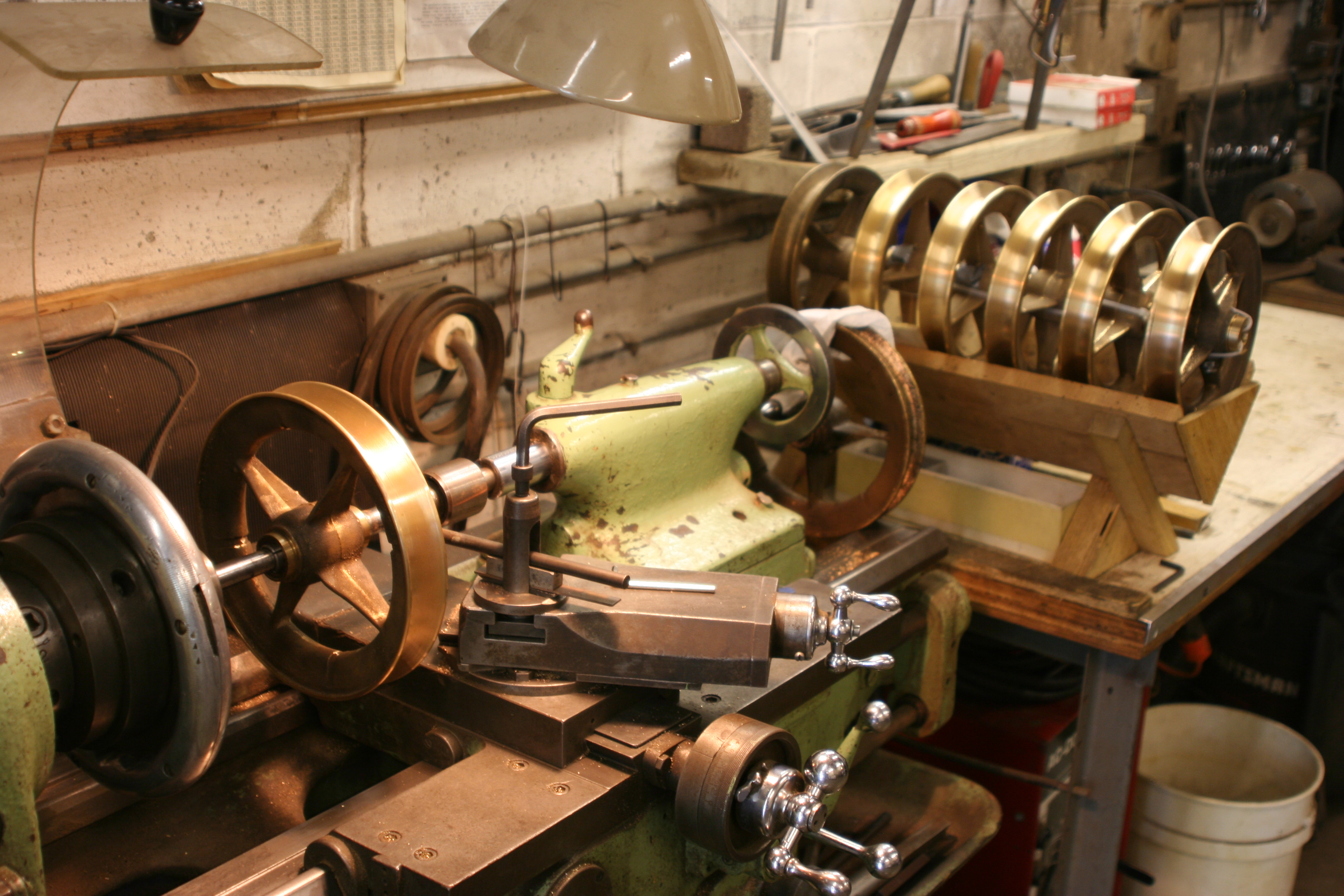
Machining spare trolley pole wheels

An early development of an experimental tramway in Toronto, Ontario, was built in 1883, having been developed by John Joseph Wright, brother of swindler Whitaker Wright. While Wright may have assisted in the installation of electric railways at the Canadian National Exhibition (CNE), and may even have used a pole system, there is no evidence about this. Likewise, Wright never filed or was issued a patent.

Credit for development of the first working trolley pole is given to Charles Joseph Van Depoele, a Belgian engineer who moved to the United States in 1869. Van Depoele made the first public demonstration of the spring-loaded device on a temporary streetcar line installed at the Toronto Industrial Exhibition (now the CNE) in autumn 1885. Depoele's first trolley pole was "crude" and not very reliable, and he reverted to using the troller system of current collection for a commercial installation on a streetcar system in South Bend, Indiana, which opened on November 14, 1885, and on one in Montgomery, Alabama, in April 1886. However, within a few months, Van Depoele switched to the trolley-pole system for the Montgomery operation. Van Depoele and fellow inventor Frank J. Sprague were "working on similar ideas at about the same time", and Sprague employed trolley-pole current collection on an electric streetcar system he installed in Richmond, Virginia, in 1888, also improving the trolley pole wheel and pole designs. Known as the Richmond Union Passenger Railway, this 12-mile (19 km) system was the first large-scale trolley line in the world, opening to great fanfare on February 12, 1888.

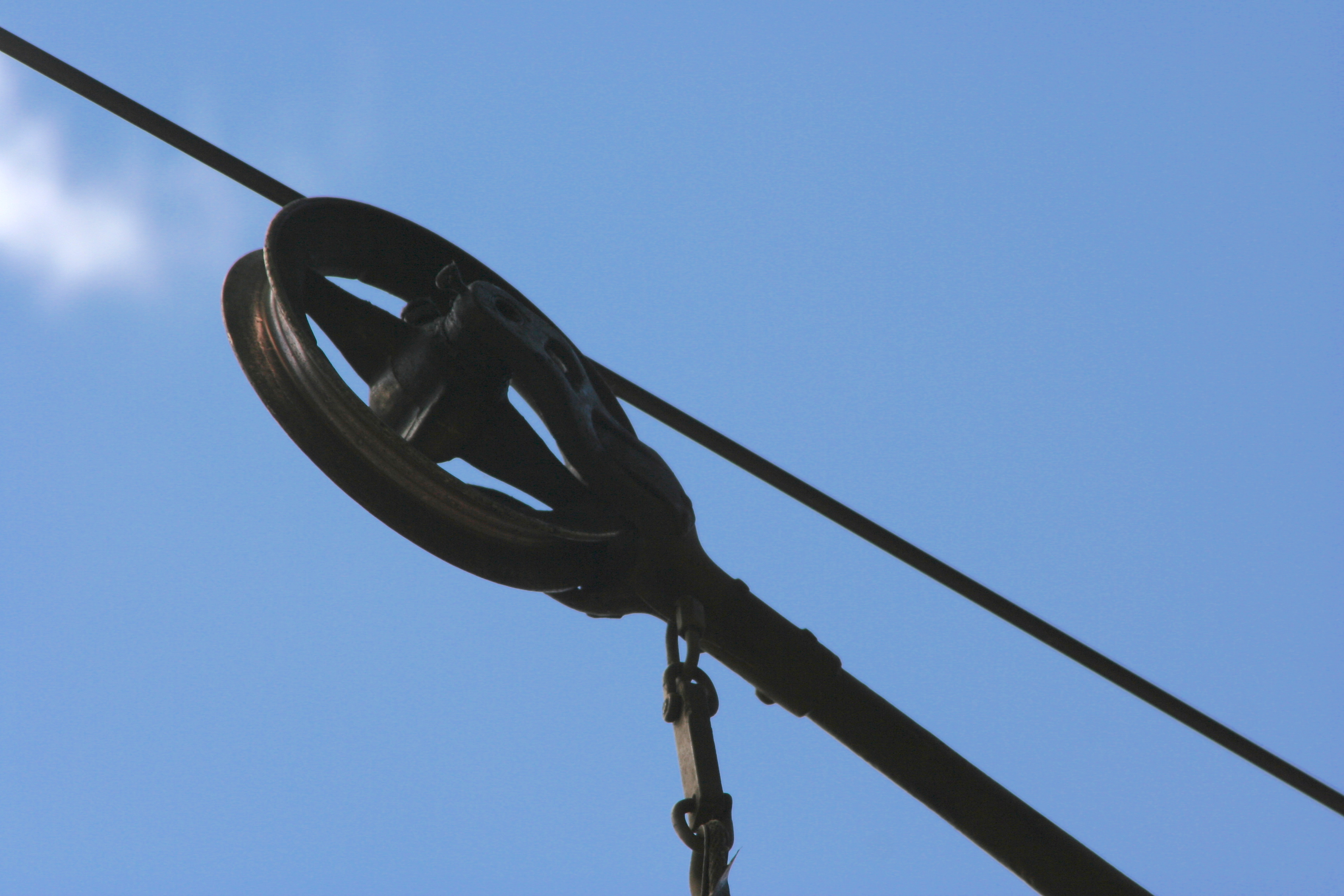
Trolley pole wheel on Twin City Rapid Transit Company No. 1300

The grooved trolley wheel was used on many large city systems through the 1940s and 1950s; it was generally used on systems with "old" style round cross sectional overhead wire. The trolley wheel was problematic at best; the circumferential contact of the grooved wheel bearing on the underside of the overhead wire provided minimal electrical contact and tended to arc excessively, increasing overhead wire wear. The newer sliding carbon trolley shoe was generally used with a newer grooved overhead trolley wire of a roughly "figure 8" cross section. The sliding trolley shoe provided better electrical contact (with a reduction in arcing), and it dramatically reduced overhead wire wear. Many systems began converting to the sliding trolley shoe in the 1920s; Milwaukee, Wisconsin converted its large system in the late 1920s. Philadelphia did not convert its trolley wheels on its remaining streetcars until 1978. Although a streetcar with a trolley wheel may evoke an antique look, the trolley shoe is modern and more practical as well as economical.

== Description of the device ==
A trolley pole is not attached to the overhead wire. The pole sits atop a sprung base on the roof of the vehicle, with springs providing the pressure to keep the trolley wheel or shoe in contact with the wire. If the pole is made of wood, a cable brings the electric current down to the vehicle. A metal pole may use such a cable, or may itself be electrically "live", requiring the base to be insulated from the vehicle body.

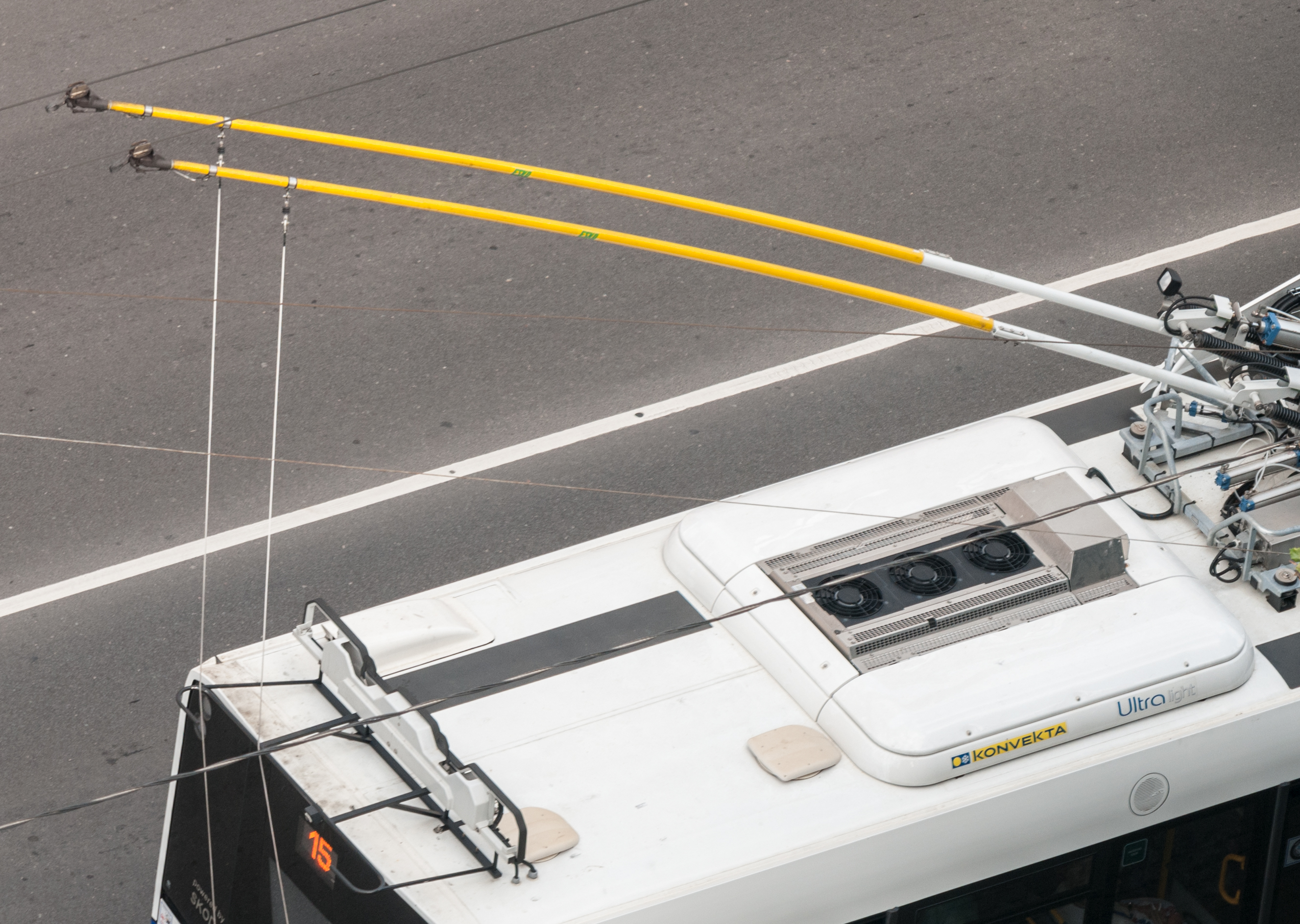
Trolley poles installed on a Škoda 27Tr Solaris trolleybus in Riga, Latvia

On systems with double-ended tram cars capable of running in both directions, the trolley pole must always be pulled behind the car and not pushed, or "dewiring" is very likely, which can cause damage to the overhead wires. At terminus points, the conductor must turn the trolley pole around to face the correct direction, pulling it off the wire either with a rope or a pole and walking it around to the other end. In some cases, two trolley poles are provided, one for each direction: in this case it is a matter of raising one and lowering the other. Since the operator could raise the pole at one end whilst the conductor lowered the other, this saved time and was much easier for the conductor. Care had to be taken to raise the downed pole first, to eliminate the damage caused by arcing between the pole and wire. In the US, the dual-pole system was the most common arrangement on double-ended vehicles. However, pushing of the pole (called "back-poling" in the US or "spear-poling" in Australia), was quite common where the trams were moving at slow speeds, such as at wye terminals (also known as reversers) and whilst backing into the sheds.

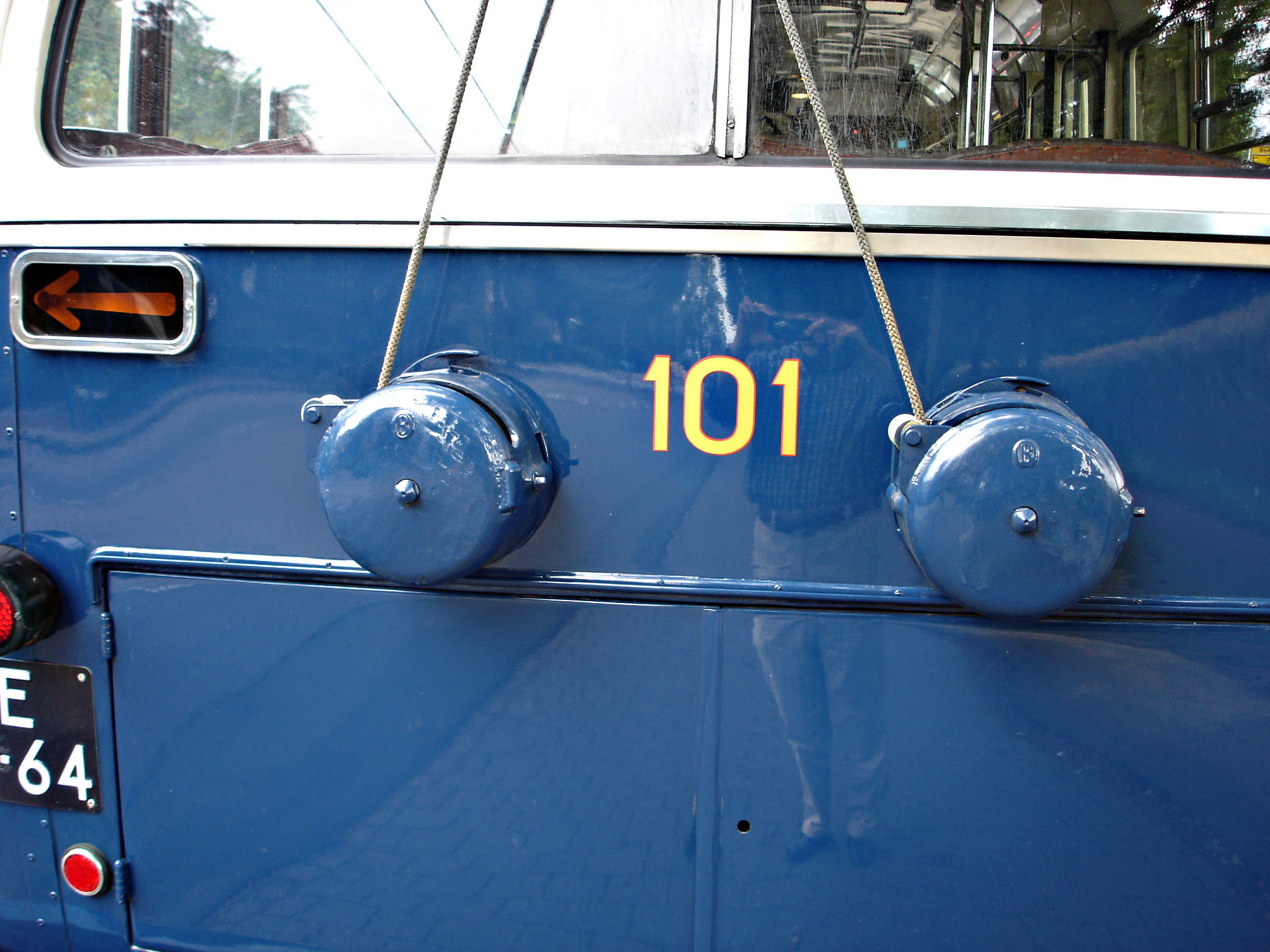
Trolley retrievers on the back of a 1949 trolleybus

Trolley poles are usually raised and lowered manually by a rope from the back of the vehicle. The rope feeds into a spring reel mechanism, called a "trolley catcher" or "trolley retriever". The trolley catcher contains a detent, like that in an automotive shoulder safety belt, which "catches" the rope to prevent the trolley pole from flying upward if the pole is dewired. The similar looking retriever (see photo) adds a spring mechanism that yanks the pole downward if it should leave the wire, pulling it away from all overhead wire fittings. Catchers are commonly used on trams operating at lower speeds, as in a city, whilst retrievers are used on suburban and interurban lines to limit damage to the overhead at speed.

On some older systems, the poles were raised and lowered using a long pole with a metal hook. Where available, these may have been made of bamboo due to its length, natural straightness and strength, combined with its relative light weight and the fact that it is an insulator. Trolleybuses usually carried one with the vehicle, for use in the event of dewirement, but tram systems usually had them placed along the route at locations where the trolley pole would need reversing.

The poles used on trolleybuses are typically longer than those used on trams, to allow the bus to take fuller advantage of its not being restricted to a fixed path in the street (the rails), by giving a degree of lateral steerability, enabling the trolleybus to board passengers at curbside.

== Single- and double-pole usage ==
When used on a tram or trolley car (i.e. a railway vehicle), a single trolley pole usually collects current from the overhead wire, and the steel rails on the tracks act as the electrical return. To reduce electrolytic corrosion of underground pipes and metallic structures, most tram lines are operated with the wire positive with respect to the rails. Trolleybuses, on the other hand, must use two trolley poles and dual overhead wires, one pole and wire for the positive "live" current, the other for the negative or neutral return. The tramway system in Havana, Cuba, also utilized the dual-wire system, as did the Cincinnati, Ohio streetcar system.

== Decline in usage on railways ==
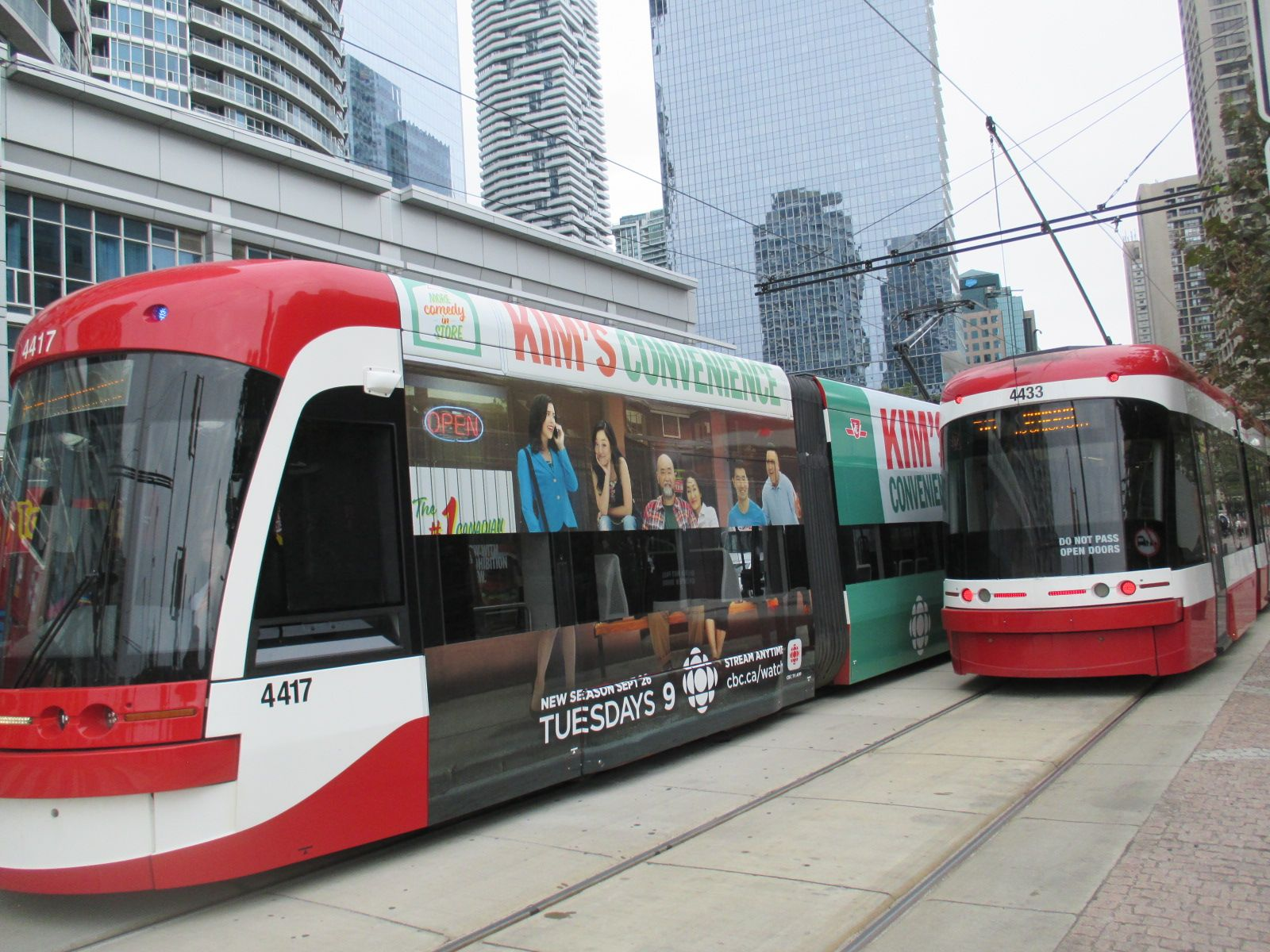
Pantograph(left) and trolley pole in use on Queens Quay West, Toronto

All trolleybuses use trolley poles, and thus trolley poles remain in use worldwide, wherever trolleybuses are in operation (some 315 cities as of 2011), and several manufacturers continue to make them, including Kiepe, Škoda and Lekov.

However, on most railway vehicles using overhead wire, the trolley pole has given way to the bow collector or, later, the pantograph, a folding metal device that presses a wide contact pan against the overhead wire. While more complex than the trolley pole, the pantograph has the advantage of being almost free from dewiring, being more stable at high speed, and being easier to raise and lower automatically. Also, on double-ended trams, they eliminate the need to manually turn the trolley pole when changing direction (although this disadvantage can be overcome to some extent through the use of trolley reversers). The use of pantographs (or bow collectors) exclusively also eliminates the need for wire frogs (switches in the overhead wiring) to make sure the pole goes in the correct direction at junctions.

The trolley pole with a shoe at its tip is problematic for longer modern streetcars that draw more electricity than older streetcars. In Toronto, the trolley pole shoe contains a carbon insert to provide electrical contact with the overhead wire and to lower the shoe to clear overhead wire hangers. Carbon inserts wear out and must be periodically replaced. The trolley shoe inserts on Toronto's modern Flexity Outlook streetcars quickly wear out in rainy conditions, lasting as little as eight hours instead of the expected one to two days for shorter older streetcars. The extra current draw shortens the life of the carbon insert. A worn-out carbon insert would damage the overhead wire, stopping streetcar service.

Apart from heritage streetcar lines, very few tram/streetcar systems worldwide continue to use trolley poles on vehicles used in normal service.

=== Compatibility with pantographs ===
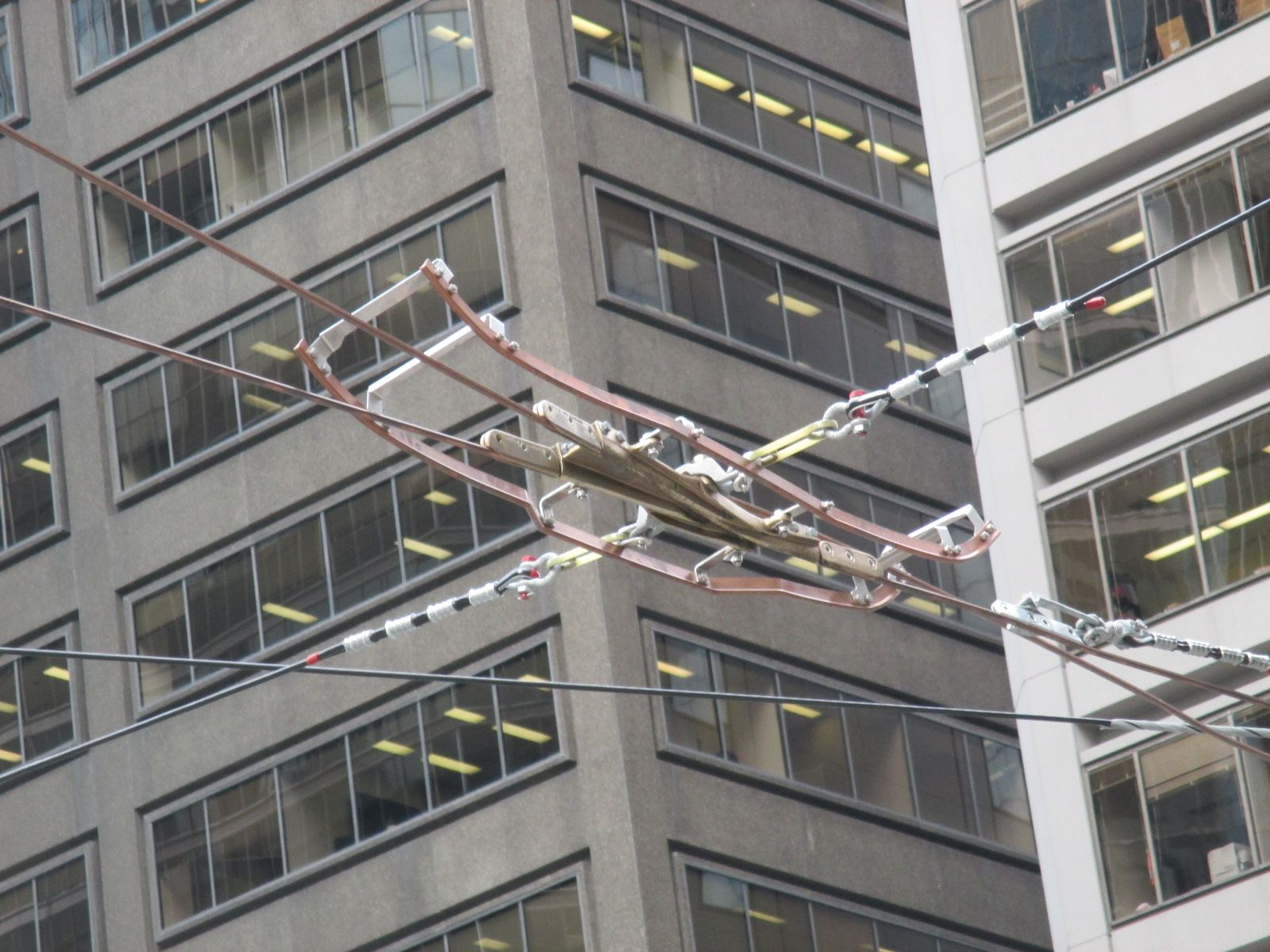
Overhead over a switch in Toronto: Two runners for pantographs flank the trolley pole frog.

Trams or light rail cars equipped with pantographs normally cannot operate on lines with overhead wiring designed for trolley-pole collection. For this reason, these systems and a few others worldwide retain use of trolley poles, even on new streetcars, in order to avoid the difficulty and expense of modifying long stretches of existing overhead wires to accept pantographs.

However, the Toronto Transit Commission, with the impending replacement of its legacy CLRV and ALRV with new Flexity Outlook cars, converted its overhead power supply to be compatible with both trolley poles and pantographs on an interim basis, as the CLRVs and ALRVs use only trolley poles while the Flexity fleet is equipped for both trolley poles and pantographs.

Large portions of San Francisco's surface network are also set up to handle both trolley pole and pantograph operation in order to allow for compatibility both with Muni's current fleet of light rail vehicles (pantograph only), as well as Muni's historic streetcar fleet (trolley pole only).

== Cultural references ==
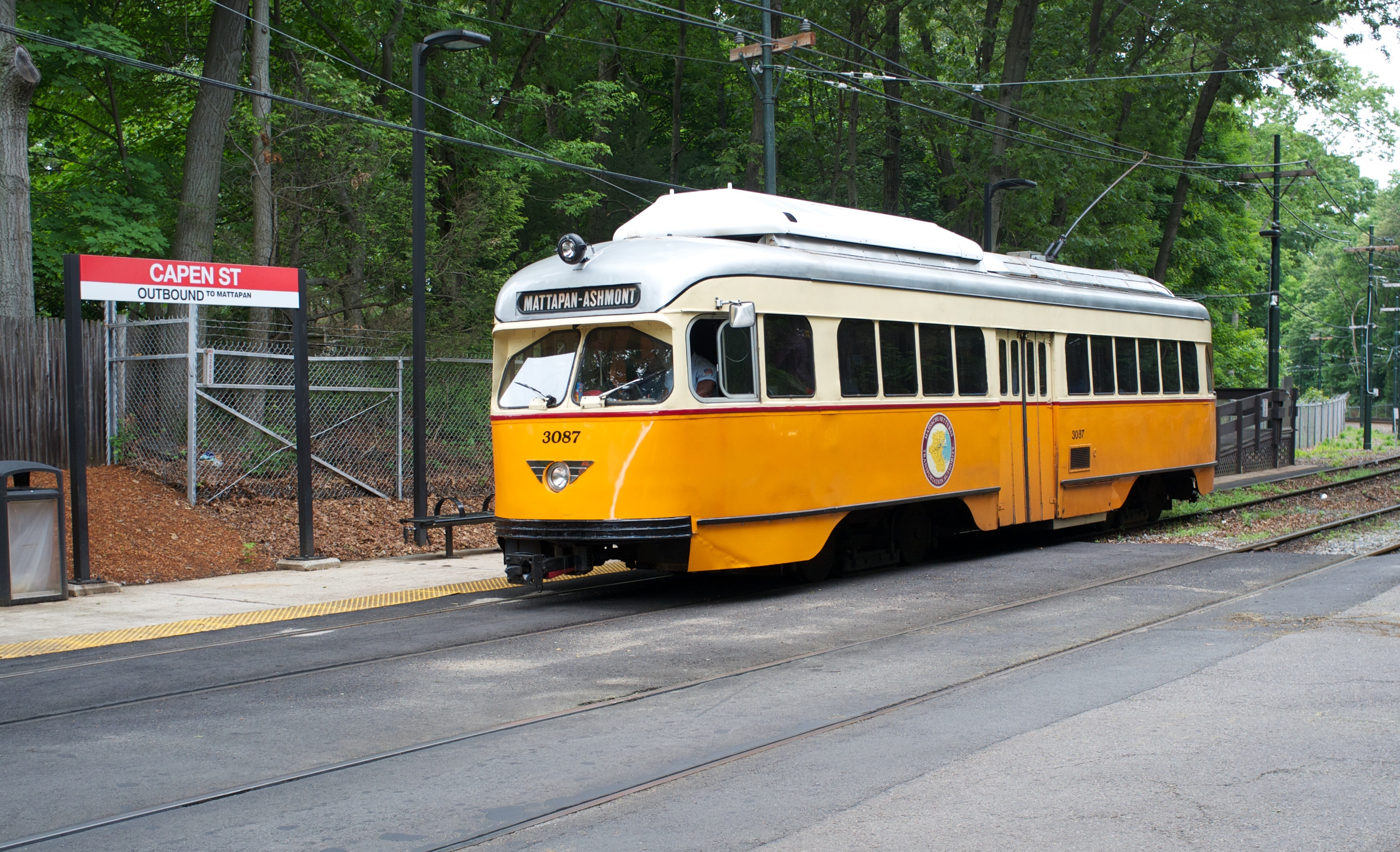
Classic PCC streetcars with trolley poles are still used in Boston

Upon their introduction, trolley poles and the new electrical technology they represented were fascinating to writers, with their lightning-like sparks and power.

In January 1889, Boston introduced its first electric streetcars, which became so popular and noteworthy that poet Oliver Wendell Holmes composed a verse about the new trolley pole technology, and the sparking contact shoe at its apex:

Since then on many a car you'll see
A broomstick as plain as plain can be;
On every stick there's a witch astride—
The string you see to her leg is tied.

In 1947, composer Samuel Barber wrote the now-classic orchestral and vocal piece Knoxville: Summer of 1915, based on the childhood reminiscences of James Agee. Partway through the composition, the singer refers to a noisy passing streetcar, with its overhead trolley pole and sparks:

A streetcar raising into iron moan;
stopping;
belling and starting, stertorous;
rousing and raising again
its iron increasing moan
and swimming its gold windows and straw seats
on past and past and past,
the bleak spark crackling and cursing above it
like a small malignant spirit
set to dog its tracks;

== List of tram systems using trolley pole ==
Country	Network	Route length	Voltage	Notes
Argentina	Tramway Histórico de Buenos Aires	2 km	750 V	Heritage streetcar
Australia	Trams in Ballarat	1.37 km	600 V	Heritage streetcar
Australia	Trams in Bendigo		600 V	Heritage streetcar
Brazil	Santa Teresa Tram	6 km	600 V	Heritage streetcar
Canada	Toronto streetcar system	83 km	600 V	in process of conversion to pantograph
Canada	High Level Bridge Streetcar	3 km		Heritage streetcar
Egypt	Trams in Alexandria	32 km		
Hong Kong	Hong Kong Tramways	13 km	550 V	
India	Trams in Kolkata	28 km	550 V	
Latvia	Trams in Daugavpils	27 km		
Latvia	Trams in Riga	61 km		new Škoda trams in Riga have pantographs
Portugal	Trams in Lisbon	31 km	600 V	
Portugal	Trams in Porto	8.9 km	600 V	Heritage streetcar
Portugal	Trams in Sintra	11.5 km		Heritage streetcar
New Zealand	Trams in Christchurch	1.5 km	600 V	Heritage streetcar
South Africa	Trams in Kimberley, Northern Cape	1.4 km	500 V	Heritage streetcar
Spain	Tramvia Blau (in Barcelona)	1.28 km		Heritage streetcar; service suspended since 2018
United Kingdom	Seaton Tramway	4.8 km	120 V	Heritage streetcar
United Kingdom	Wirral Tramway	1.1 km	550 V	Heritage streetcar
Isle of Man	Manx Electric Railway	27 km	550 V	Heritage streetcar
USA	Boston Mattapan Trolley	4.1 km	600 V	PCC streetcars
USA	Dallas, M-Line Trolley	7.4 km	600 V	Heritage streetcar
USA	Streetcars in Kenosha, Wisconsin	2.7 km	600 V	
USA	Streetcar in Little Rock	5.5 km	600 V	Heritage streetcar
USA	New Orleans streetcar system	35.9 km	600 V	
USA	Philadelphia streetcars (SEPTA Subway–Surface Trolley Lines and Route 15)	59 km	600 V	
USA	San Francisco, E Embarcadero and F Market & Wharves	9.7 km	600 V	Heritage streetcar
USA	Streetcars in Tampa	4.3 km	600 V	Heritage streetcar

- Iowa Traction Railway is one of the rarest non-streetcar railway using trolley pole

== See also ==
- Current collectors
  - Bow collector
  - Collector pole
  - Contact shoe
  - Pantograph (transport)
- Railway electrification system
