= Noverça =

Portuguese footballer

Personal information
- Full name: Hélder António Freitas Noverça
- Date of birth: 18 December 1970 (age 55)
- Place of birth: Massarelos, Portugal
- Height: 1.82 m (6 ft 0 in)
- Position: Forward

Youth career
- Porto
- 1986–1989: Leixões

Senior career*
Years	Team	Apps	(Gls)
1989–1995	Leixões		
1995–1996	Tirsense		
1996–1997	Aves		
1997–1999	Leça		
1999–2000	Penafiel		
2000	Aves		
2000–2001	Gil Vicente		
2001–2002	Leça		
2002–2003	Penafiel		
2003	Naval		
2003–2004	Espinho		
2004–2006	Aliados Lordero		
2007–2008	Pedras Rubras		
2007	Fão		
2008	Ataense		
- * Club domestic league appearances and goals

Hélder António Freitas Noverça (born 18 December 1970) is a retired Angolan-born Portuguese football midfielder.
