= Sociedade de Transportes Colectivos do Porto =

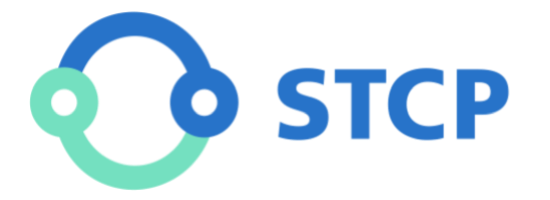
- Founded: 1946
- Headquarters: Av. Fernão de Magalhães, 1862 - 13º, 4350-158
- Locale: Porto, Portugal
- Service type: bus, heritage tram
- Routes: 83 (including 11 late night-only routes), of which 3 are tram lines
- Fleet: 472 bus 8 tram (in regular use)
- Daily ridership: approx. 370,000 (weekdays) (2009)
- Annual ridership: 107 million (2007); 108 million (2009)
- Chief executive: Cristina Pimentel
- Website: stcp.pt

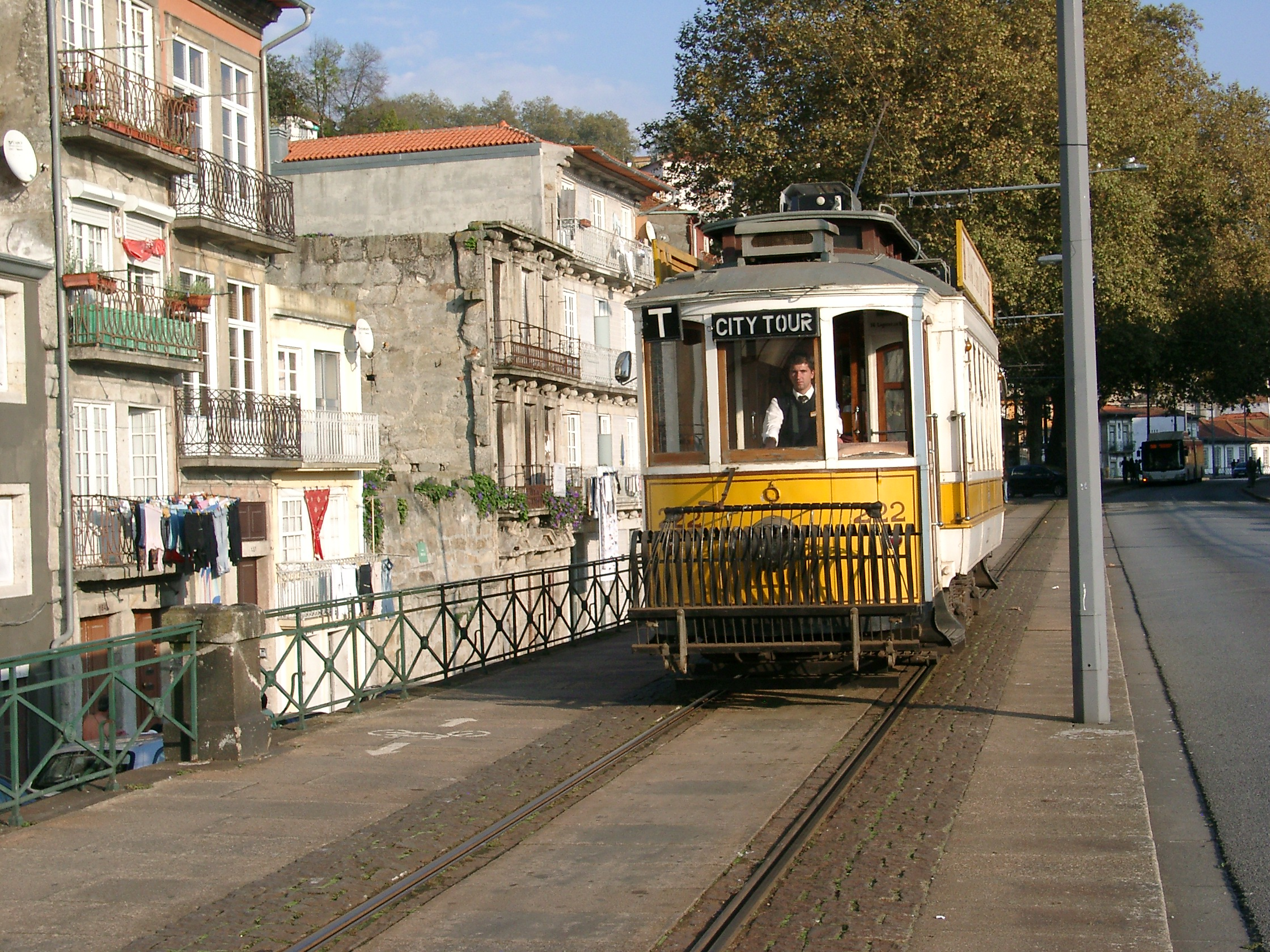
An eléctrico (tram) on line T

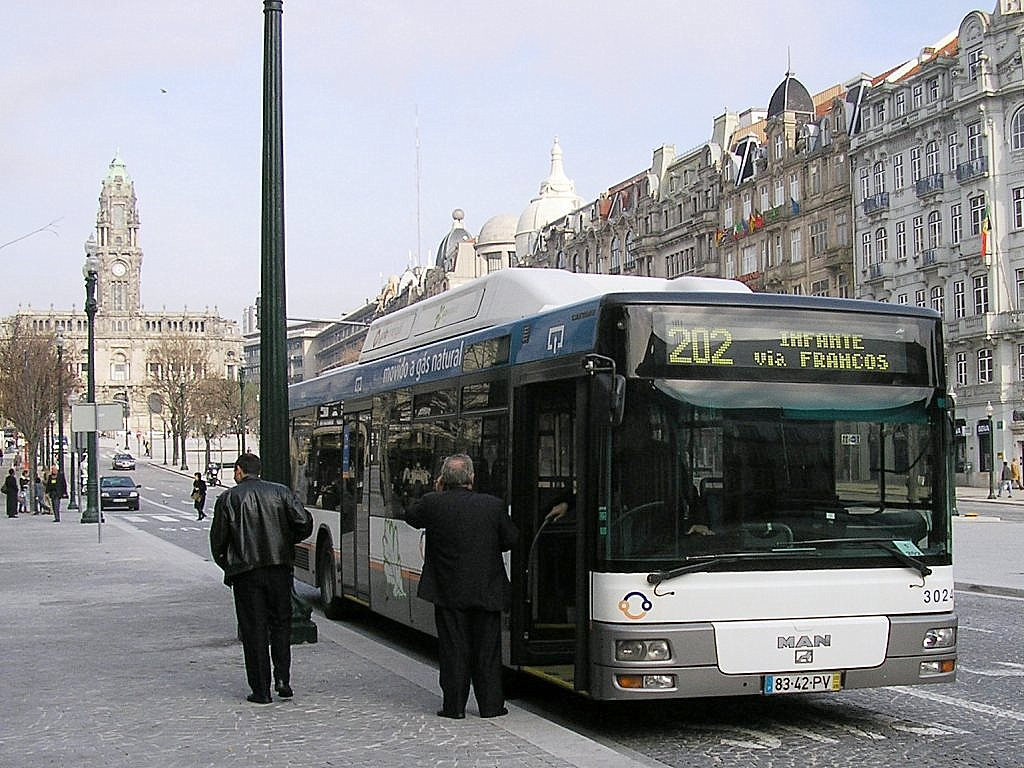
STCP bus

STCP (Sociedade de Transportes Colectivos do Porto, E.I.M., S.A., lit. Porto Public Transport Society) is the public transport company that runs the bus and tram service in Greater Porto, Portugal. Created in 1946, it took over the Porto tram system from its privately owned predecessor and continues to operate it today, but the formerly large tram system now has only three lines, which are heritage tram lines, and the STCP network is now mostly bus service. STCP does not operate the city's light rail system, Porto Metro, but owns 25% of it. It is a public company controlled by a board responsible to the central government and had about 1,500 employees in 2009. STCP operates 83 bus routes – of which 11 are late-night-only routes – and the bus service covers 539 km of routes.

== History ==
STCP's name originally was Serviço de Transportes Colectivos do Porto. It was created in 1946, when the municipality took over the Companhia Carris de Ferro do Porto (CCFP) (the Porto Tramways Company), which had been in operation since 1873 and, apart from a brief period in 1907–08, had provided all public transport service in Porto since 1893. The municipal government purchased CCFP under a contract option accepted by the private company in 1906. An operating concession granted to the company at that time gave it an exclusive franchise to operate public transport in Porto but included an option allowing the city to purchase the system after 35 years. It did so in 1946, adopting the name Serviço de Transportes Colectivos do Porto for the new municipal authority. In addition to trams and buses, STCP's service included trolleybuses from 1959 to 1997.

In 1994, STCP became a Sociedade Anónima (limited liability company), and the first word of its name was changed to "Sociedade".

== Fleet ==
STCP's fleet includes natural gas and hybrid buses. The company has a small R&D group that has developed technologies to support the eco-friendly fleet, like a pump for natural gas with higher throughput. This enabled buses to spend a smaller time at the pumps refilling.

As of 2009, low-floor vehicles comprise 92% of STCP's fleet, and 73% of the fleet is air-conditioned. The fleet also included 15 double-decker buses at that time. The company is migrating its fleet to use the Andante ticketing system.

== See also ==
- Porto Metro
- Trams in Porto
- Porto Tram Museum
