= Charles Joseph Van Depoele =

Inventor of the overhead third rail for light rail

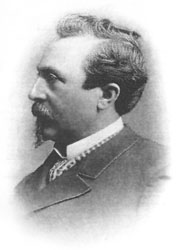
- Charles Joseph Van Depoele
- Born: Carolus Josephus Vandepoele; 27 April 1846; Lichtervelde, Province of West-Flanders, Belgium
- Died: 18 March 1892 (aged 45); Lynn, Massachusetts, US
- Resting place: St. Mary’s Catholic Cemetery; Lynn, Massachusetts, US
- Occupation: electrical engineer
- Known for: electric railway

Charles Joseph Van Depoele (27 April 1846 – 18 March 1892) was a Belgian-American electrical engineer, inventor, and pioneer in electric railway technology, including the first trolley pole.

== Biography ==
=== Early life in Belgium ===
Van Depoele was born as Carolus Josephus Vandepoele in Lichtervelde, Province of West-Vlaanderen, Belgium, the son of Pieter-Joannes Vandepoele, a furniture maker from Ghent, and his wife, Marie-Theresia Algoet. Three months after his birth, the family moved to Bruges. At a young age, he dabbled in electricity, and became so thoroughly infatuated with the subject that he entered upon a course of study and experiment in Poperinghe. In 1861, while at college, he produced his first light with a battery of forty Bunsen cells. Later, he moved to Lille, France, where he attended regularly the lectures and experiments of the Imperial Lyceum from 1864 to 1869.

=== Move to the US ===
In 1869 he moved to the United States and took up his residence in Detroit, where he made a living by manufacturing furniture. He did not abandon his electrical pursuits, experimenting with electric lighting, electric generators and electric motors, and eventually forming the Van Depoele Electric Manufacturing Company.

=== Electric railways ===
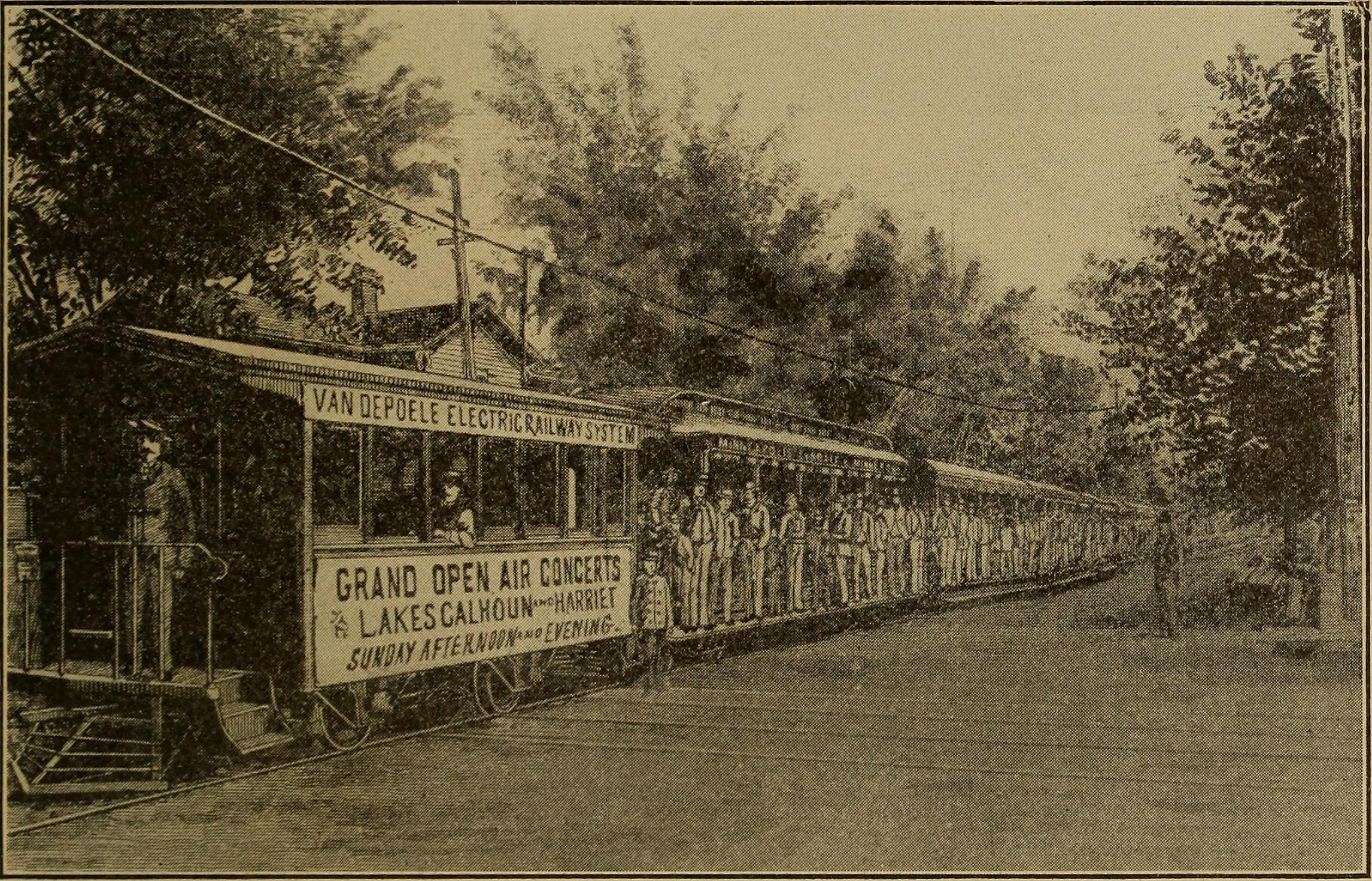
Electric locomotive car and train. Van Depoele, Minneapolis, 1883

As early as 1874, Van Depoele began investigations into the field of electric locomotion. Van Depoele's first electric railway was laid in Chicago early in 1883, and he exhibited another at an exposition in that city later in the same year. In 1885, he invented and demonstrated the first trolley pole, a device used by electric streetcars (trams) to collect current from overhead wires, introducing it publicly on a line installed temporarily at the Toronto Industrial Exhibition in autumn 1885, reportedly reaching 65 mph. Fellow inventor Frank J. Sprague was studying similar ideas at the same time. Sprague improved the design and is sometimes credited as the trolley pole's inventor.

Near the end of 1887, thirteen North American cities had electric railways in operation; nine of these systems were designed by Van Depoele, and used overhead lines to transmit electric current from an electrical generator to the electric locomotives on the rails.

=== Electric lighting ===
Van Depoele sold his electric motor business and related patents to the Thomson-Houston Electric Company in early 1888. He briefly thereafter devoted his efforts to his electric lighting business, until he sold that concern also to Thomson-Houston in mid-1889.

== Patents ==
A prolific inventor, Van Depoele was granted at least 243 United States patents between 1881 and 1894 for various electric inventions including railway systems, lights, generators, motors, current regulators, pumps, telpher systems, batteries, hammers, rock drills, brakes, a gearless locomotive, a coal-mining machine, and a pile-driver.

== Recognition ==
He received the most recognition for his role in the development of electric railways; George Herbert Stockbridge wrote in 1891, "It is probably only just to Mr. Van Depoele to say that he is entitled to more credit than any other one man for the exploitation of electricity as a motive power."

== Death ==
Van Depoele died on 18 March 1892 at the age of 45 in Lynn, Massachusetts, leaving a wife and several children.

This article incorporates text from the references listed below, publications now in the public domain.

== Bibliography ==
- Obituary, "Charles J. Van Depoele." Western Electrician, 26 March 1892 (Volume 10, No. 13), page 193.
- "Obituary"., Transactions of the American Institute of Electrical Engineers, 19 April 1892 (Volume 9, No. 4), pages 175–178.
- Charles Holt, "Development of Electric Railways.", The New England Magazine, October 1888 (Volume 6, No. 36), pages 551–566.
- Douglas McKillop, "The Father of the Trolley: A Biographical Sketch of Charles J. Van Depoele", The Electrical Age, December 1905 (Volume 35, No. 6), pages 440–443.
- Frankland Jannus, "Life and Labor of Van DePoele", The Electrical Journal, 1 May 1896 (Volume 1, No. 23), pages 449–453.
- "Notes and Queries.", Manufacturer and Builder, October 1887 (Volume 19, No. 10), pages 239–240.
- George Herbert Stockbridge, "Later History of Electricity.", The New England Magazine, April 1891 (Volume 10, No. 2), pages 183–193.
