= Andante ticket =

Public transport ticketing system in Porto, Portugal

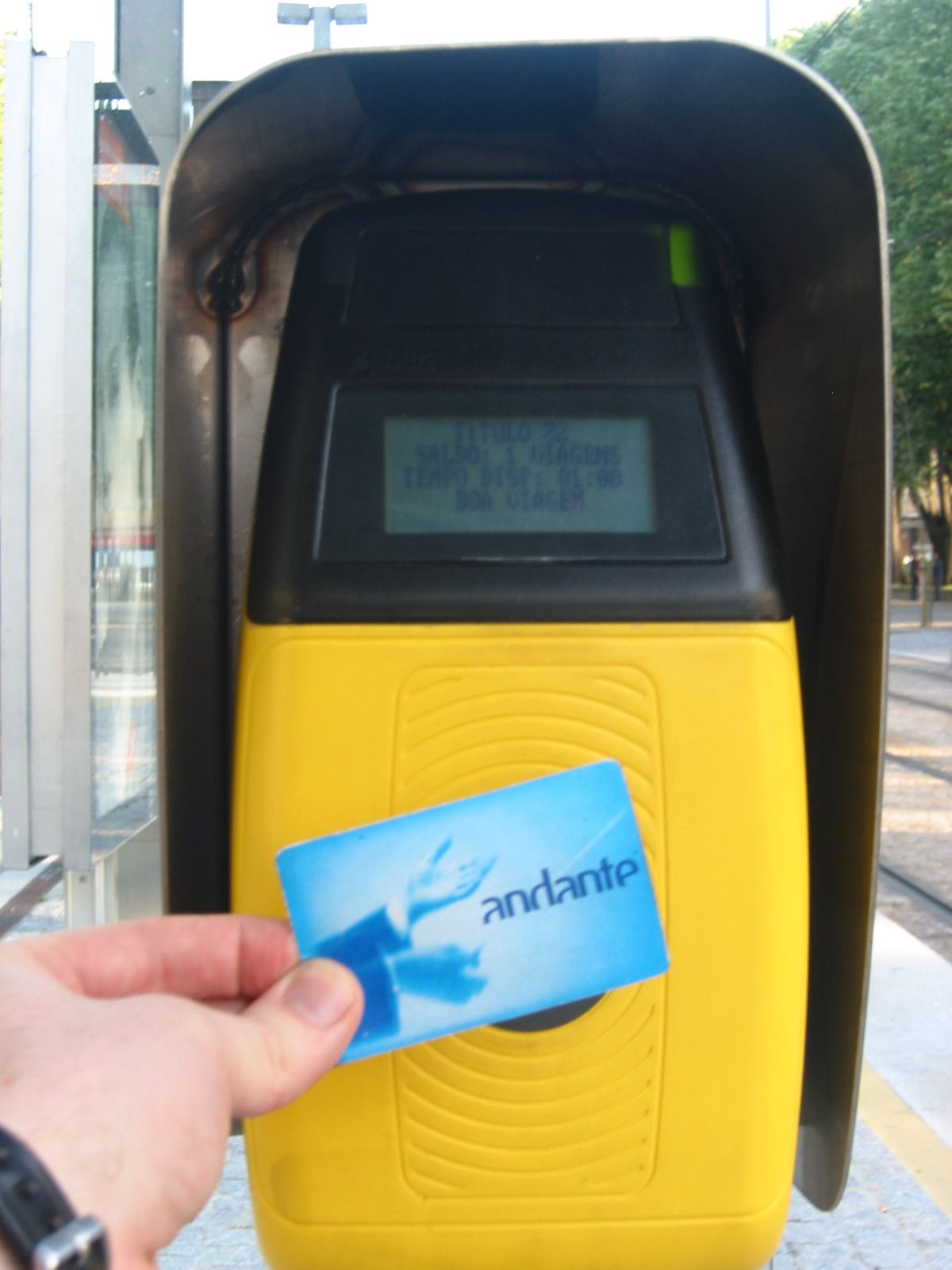
A ticket being validated

Andante is a public transport ticketing system used in and around Porto, Portugal. It started operation in November 2002 at Metro do Porto stations and is now a cross-network ticket used on the Porto Metro, selected bus and train routes and the Funicular dos Guindais cable railway.

Two types of card are currently in use:

- Occasional or Azul (blue): This card is a rechargeable ticket intended for occasional riders, and contains a small, flexible memory card within the laminated ticket. The card has an estimated life-span of about one year.
- Season or Gold: Similar to a credit card in shape and material, it has a memory chip on the surface. Gold tickets also feature the holder's name and laser-scanned photograph. It has a life-time of several years.

Occasional tickets can be bought at the terminals in stations. Ticket machines can recharge both kinds of ticket, although Gold tickets can only be purchased in Lojas Andante (Andante Shops). Tickets can also be recharged at MultiBanco ATMs. When purchasing tickets, passengers must select how many zones the card will allow travel within. The minimum Z2 (2 zone) ticket allows travel for 1 hour after validation, with allowed travel time increasing for each valid zone purchased.

Unlike others ticket zoning systems, Andante zones are not concentric. This makes the system slightly fairer, but also slightly more complicated. To travel within the same zone or up to one neighbouring zone you need Z2 ticket, the more zones you need to cross, the higher the Z ticket you need. Although with Andante Occasional you can use your tickets in any zones, with Andante Gold you must choose in advance which zones you will be travelling in.

The system uses ISO/IEC 14443 type B for communication between card readers (check-in points, automatic vending machines, vending stores and controller handsets) and the card itself. The system is entirely contactless, with validation activated by holding the ticket a short distance in front of the reader for about a second. Teams of ticket inspectors make random checks across the network with hand-held ticket readers.

From July 2021, the system was extended to allow use of contactless payment cards.
