= Elevador da Ribeira =

Public elevator in Porto, Portugal

Coordinates: 41°8′27.5″N 8°36′40″W

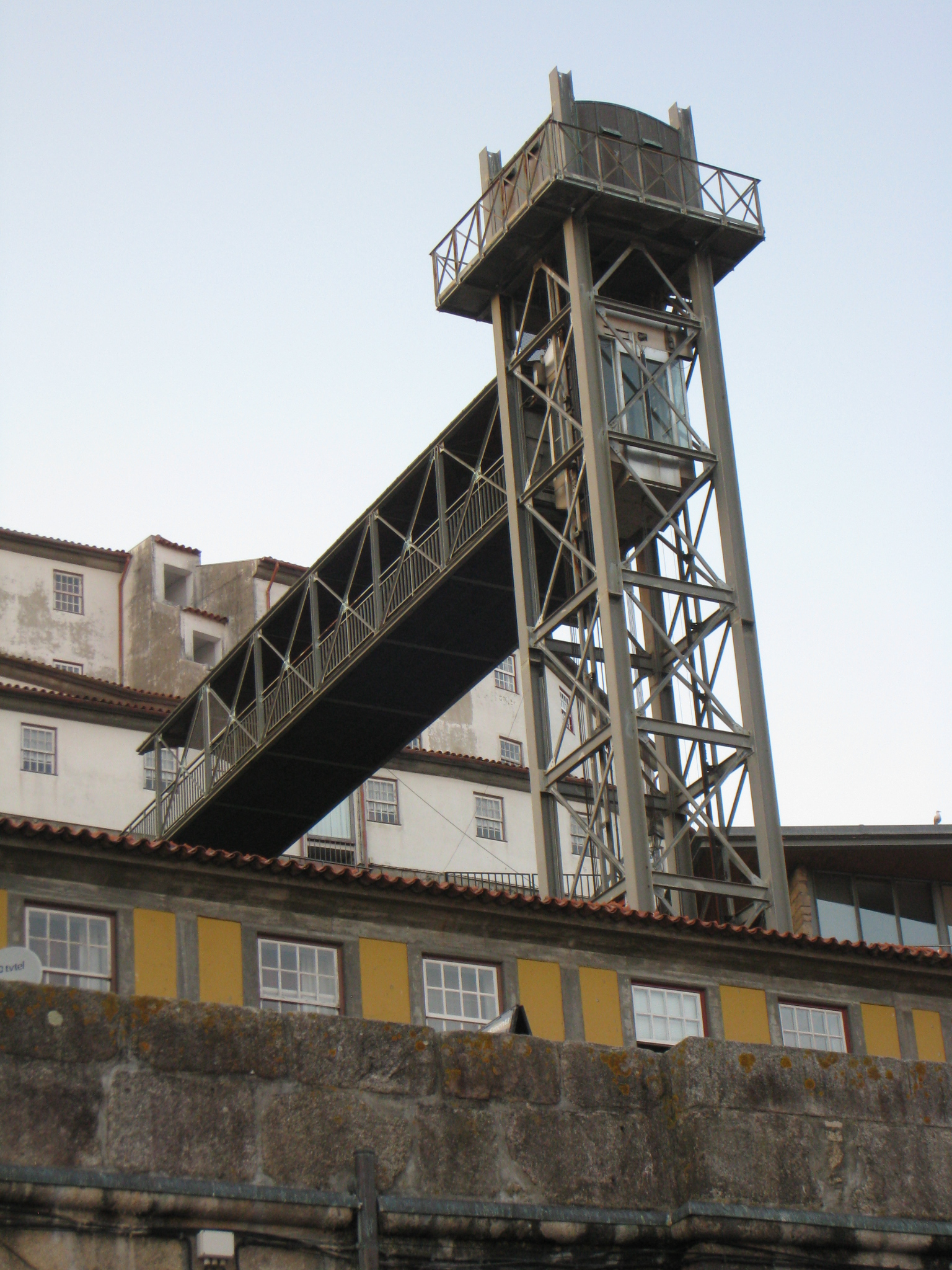
The Elevador da Ribeira

The Elevador da Ribeira or Elevador da Lada is a public elevator in Porto, Portugal. It connects the neighbourhood of Ribeira (at no. 66 of Largo dos Arcos da Ribeira, near the Dom Luís I Bridge) to the middle of the slope of Barredo, by means of a vertical lift and a footbridge.

It was designed by the architect António Moura, and its inauguration on 13 April 1994 was attended by President Mário Soares and other dignitaries.

The lift is open from Monday to Friday from 08:00 to 20:00.
