= Trams in Porto =

Public transport system in Porto, Portugal

Porto tramway network
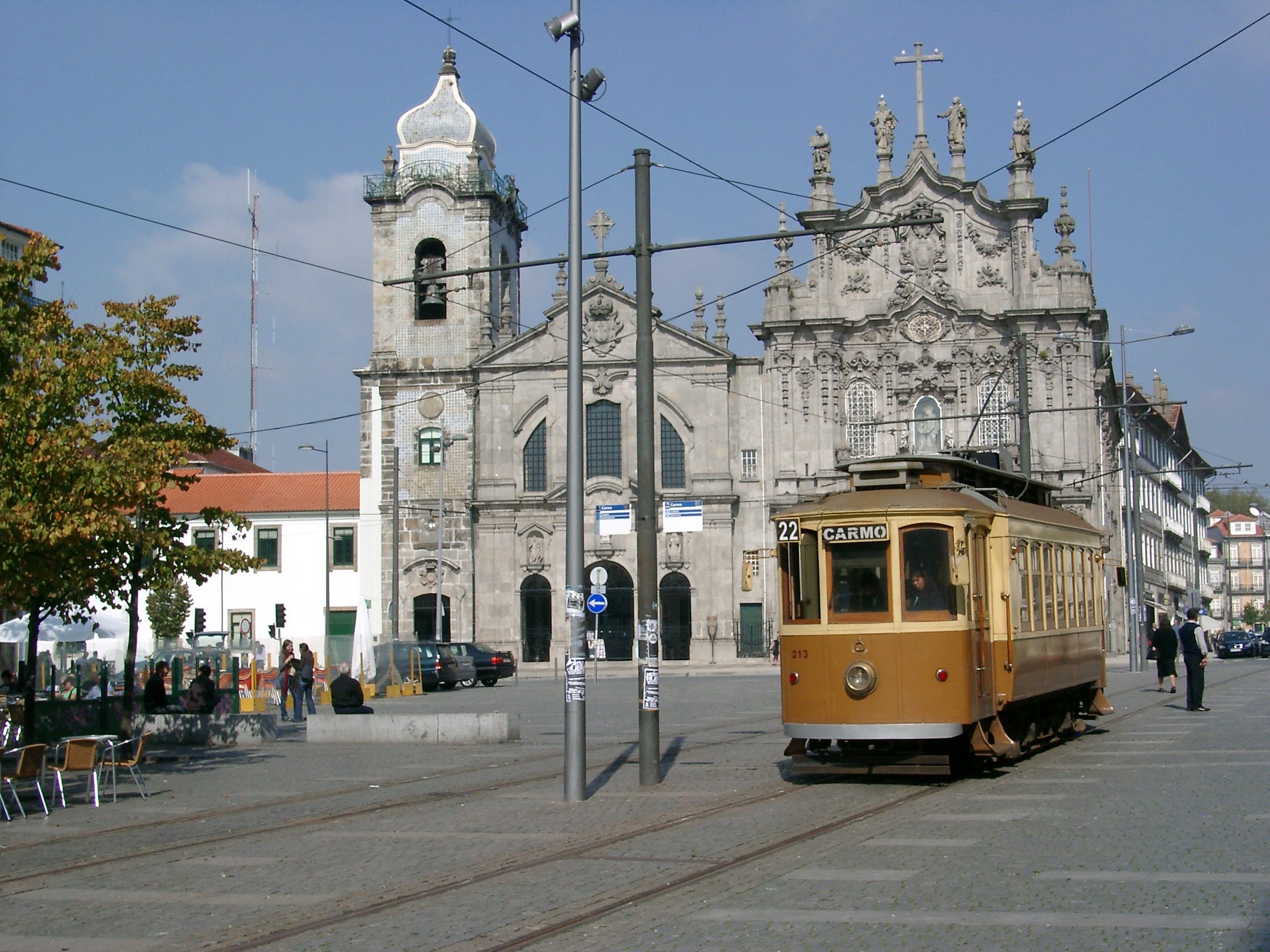
- A tram on route 22 in Porto

Operation
- Locale: Porto, Portugal

Statistics
Horsecar era: 1872–1904
- Propulsion systems: Mules; Steam (1878–1914)
Electric tram era: since 1895
- Status: Open
- Routes: 30 (maximum); 3 (present)
- Operators: Until 1946: CCFP; From 1946–present: STCP
- Track gauge: 1,435 mm (4 ft 8 1/2 in)
- Electrification: 600 V DC
- Depots: Boavista (1874–1999); Massarelos (original power station 1914–present)
- Website: http://www.stcp.pt/ STCP (in Portuguese and English)

The tram system of Porto in Portugal is operated by the Sociedade de Transportes Colectivos do Porto (STCP) and currently has three regular tram routes with 30-minute headways. All are heritage tram routes, and they use vintage tramcars exclusively.

== History ==
In 1872, the Companhia Carril Americano do Porto à Foz e Mattosinhos opened the first mule tram line in Porto, connecting Rua dos Inglezes (nowadays Infante) with Foz (Castelo) and Matosinhos. In the next year, a branch line from Massarelos to Cordoaria was opened. A second company, the Companhia Carris de Ferro do Porto (CCFP) (the Porto Tramways Company), was established in 1873, and it opened a line from Praça Carlos Alberto via Boavista to Foz (Cadouços) in 1874. More lines were added through the 1870s until the 1890s. In 1878, the CCFP line from Foz to Boavista was converted to steam traction. At Boavista, there was a change of traction between mules and steam engines. Four years later, the interurban line of the CCFP was extended from Foz (Cadouços) to Matosinhos. The CCAPFM and CCFP merged on 13 January 1893, using the latter's name for the resulting company. Electric traction was introduced in 1895. The last mule-drawn car was retired in 1904, and electrification was completed with the elimination of urban steam engines in 1914.

In 1946, the city purchased the tram system from CCFP and took over its operation, with a new municipal company, Serviço de Transportes Colectivos do Porto (STCP). By 1949, it reached its maximum length of 81 kilometers with 150 kilometers track length. The 1960s and the 1970s were marked by a continuous dismantling of tram tracks and a preference for cheaper bus transport. The system shrank from 81 kilometers with 192 cars in 1958, to 38 kilometers with 127 cars in 1968, to 21 kilometers with 84 cars in 1978, to just 14 kilometers with 16 cars in 1996. The last remaining line (18) was the start of the current heritage tram system.

A tram near the Clérigos Tower in 2025

For many years, the system had more than 20 lines, but most were closed during the 1960s and 1970s. By July 1978, only four routes remained: 1, 3, 18, and 19. Route 3 (Boavista – Pereiró) closed on 30 April 1984. For almost 10 more years, the three remaining routes continued in operation without any closures, as routes 1 (Infante – Matosinhos), 18 (Carmo – Castelo do Queijo – Boavista) and 19 (Boavista – Matosinhos). The section from Castelo do Queijo to Matosinhos was closed on 11 September 1993 with the withdrawal of route 19 and of that section of route 1. The remainder of route 1, between Castelo do Queijo and Infante, was withdrawn on 10 September 1994. On 11 June 1996, the final route, 18, was downgraded from a full-service tram line to a heritage service with reduced frequency, but operating seven days a week. Buses took over most of the service on the route at that time, but with trams continuing to operate some trips, as a heritage service. The service used only three trams, operating on a 35-minute headway. Route 18's 4 km section along Avenida Boavista was later closed, but tram service was gradually re-introduced in the 2000s on other sections, in the form of additional heritage-tram services, lines 1 and 22, as well as the former Line T (the Porto Tram City Tour, which has since been discontinued).

== Heritage system ==
The current 6 vehicles of 3 lines, 1, 18 and 22, were mostly built in Porto between 1940 and 1946 as follows below. Some restorations and complete rebuilt from 2007 to 2012, were cannibalised others similars to make a feasible functioning ride, due to the lack many parts, which were not produced anymore.

- 131, produced in 1940 and rebuilt in 2007
- 205, produced in 1944 and rebuilt in 2009
- 220, produced in 1946 and rebuilt in 2012, etc.

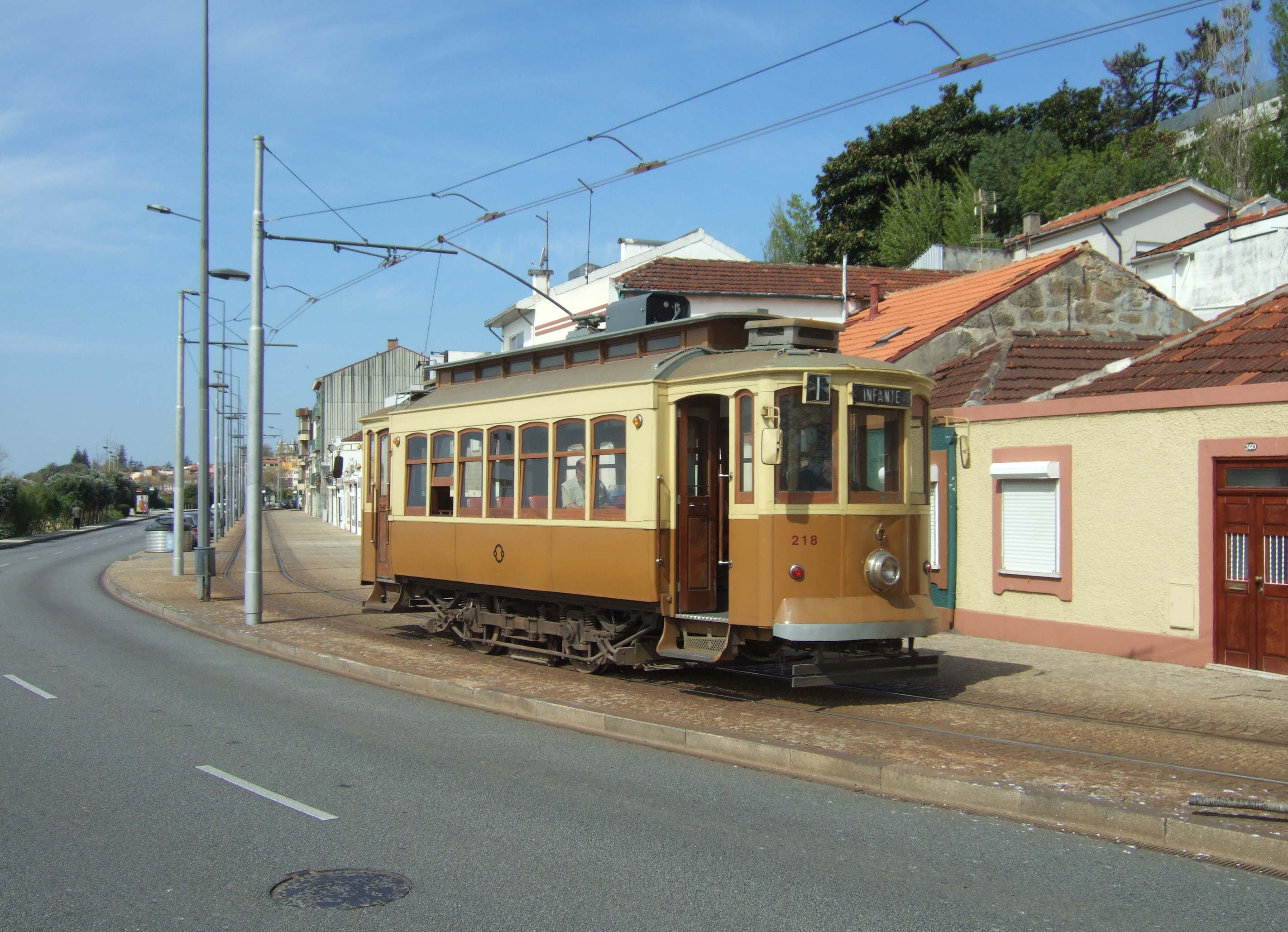
A tram on line 1

=== Lines ===
Tram fares, starting as € 6 one trip to € 12 2 days trips, are paid with a customized ticket that can be bought on board of the vehicle, at the Museum or in some hotels. Consult the STCP web site for the current fare schedule. At Lines 1 and 18 on river bank, it is the tram museum and the Garage central with restoration workshop, aside of what was a thermolectric.

- Line 1: Passeio Alegre-Infante follows the northern bank of the Douro River from Infante, via Alfândega and Massarelos, to Passeio Alegre in Foz do Douro. This line is heavily used by tourists.
- Line 18: Passeio Alegre-Clérigos: connects Passeio Alegre and Massarelos (site of the Tram Museum) and then diverges via Rua da Restauração to Carmo (Praça Parada Leitão) next to the Rectory of the University of Porto, and onwards to Clérigos.
- Line 22: Circular Carmo-Batalha: connects Carmo and Praça da Batalha with the Funicular dos Guindais, with convenient connections to three stations on the Porto Metro. Please note: due to the closure of Rua dos Clérigos for the construction of the new station in Praça da Liberdade of the Metro do Porto network, it was necessary to suspend line 22 from 10 November, 2021 for about three years.

=== Legend ===
- Metro do Porto
- Bus
- Train
- Connect with funicular
- Connect with boats
- Connect with helicopter

=== Proposed expansions ===
Line 1 - line could in the future be extended from Foz to Castelo do Queijo or even Matosinhos and from Infante to the São Bento railway station via Rua Mouzinho da Silveira.

== Tram museum ==
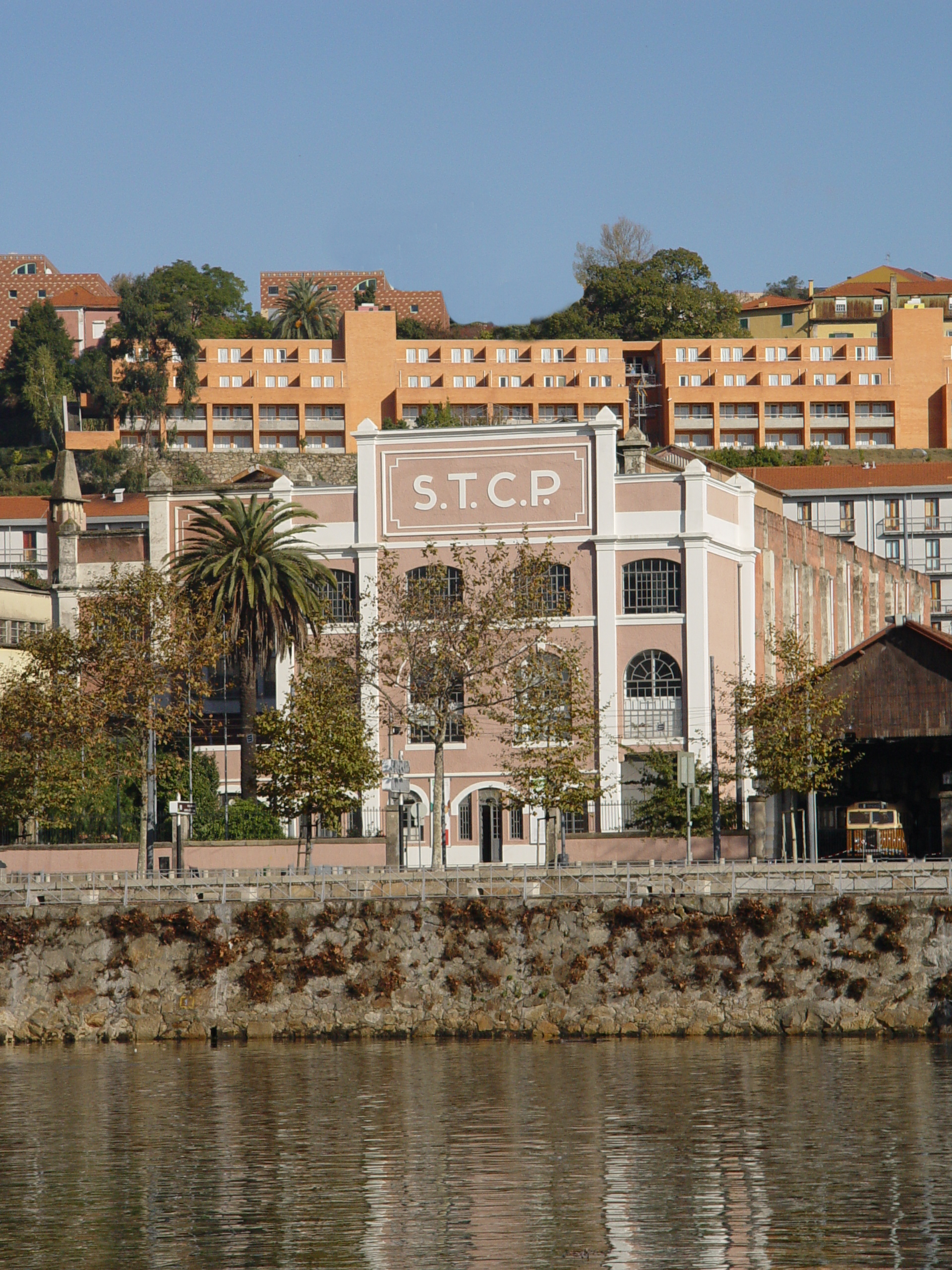
The Tram Museum building on the bank of the Douro.

The Tram Museum is located in the old central power plant of the tram in Massarelos, next to an active STCP depot. The museum was inaugurated in May 1992. It preserves sixteen electric cars, five trailer cars and two maintenance cars. A parade of old cars is held annually between Infante and Passeio Alegre.

See the museum's web site for the current entry fee. A discount may be obtained with a valid tram ticket.

== Rolling stock ==
- Brill-23 – Built by the J. G. Brill Company of Philadelphia in 1909–1910 (30 cars over 2 orders), eventually numbered 120–146 after disposal of some cars and renumbering. All retired and none remaining in Porto. One of the surviving cars, 1909-built No. 122, is now used by the McKinney Avenue Transit Authority on the M-Line Trolley in Dallas, Texas.
- Brill-28 (CCFP/STCP designation; not an indication of car's builder) – Originally 20 (Nos. 150–169) built by Brill in 1912, but all but about three were later replaced by same-numbered new cars built in CCFP's own workshops in the same general style; 30 more (Nos. 170–199) new cars built by CCFP workshops 1925–1938 in same general style as the true Brill cars. Also, some class Brill-23 cars were rebuilt by CCFP as class Brill-28. In the 1990s, some of the CCFP-built examples were sold by an American dealer in secondhand trams to the transit authority in Memphis, Tennessee, for operation on the MATA Trolley line.
- Brill-32 (CCFP designation; not an indication of car's builder) – 12 new cars built by workshops 1926–1928
- Brill-28 Plataforma Salão (CCFP designation; not an indication of car's builder) – 26 rebuilt Brill 23 or 28 cars by workshops 1938–1946

== See also ==
- Funicular dos Guindais, a cable car route in Porto, is distinct from the tram system
- Porto Metro, Porto's light rail system which is also distinct from the tram system
- List of town tramway systems in Portugal
