= Massarelos =

- Civil parish
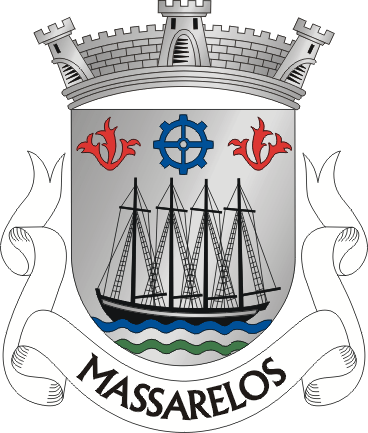
- Coat of arms

- Coordinates: 41.153°N 8.634°W
- Country: Portugal
- Region: Norte
- Metropolitan area: Metropolitan Area of Porto
- District: Porto
- Municipality: Porto
- Disbanded: 2013

Area
  - Total: 1.94 km^{2} (0.75 sq mi)

Population (2011)
  - Total: 6,789
  - Density: 3,500/km^{2} (9,100/sq mi)
- Time zone: UTC+00:00 (WET)
  - Summer (DST): UTC+01:00 (WEST)
- Website: http://www.massarelos.net/

Massarelos (Portuguese pronunciation: [mɐsɐˈɾɛluʃ]) is a former civil parish in the municipality of Porto, Portugal. In 2013, the parish merged into the new parish Lordelo do Ouro e Massarelos. The population in 2011 was 6,789, in an area of 1.94 km^{2}.

The municipality includes parts of the city's old downtown, classified by UNESCO as a World Heritage Site. Other landmarks include Porto's main Custom House, Rosa Mota sports hall, Porto's major fish market and the Campo Alegre neighborhood, where a theatre and several buildings of the University of Porto are located.

== Notable residents ==
- Luciana Abreu (born 1985) is a Portuguese singer, actress and Television host, represented Portugal in the Eurovision Song Contest 2005 as part of the pop-duo 2B
- Diogo Jota (1996–2025) was a Portuguese professional footballer who played as an attacking midfielder for English club Liverpool FC.
