= List of tourist attractions in Porto =

Porto, a popular tourist destination in Portugal, is the country's second largest city. It is located along the Douro river estuary in Northern Portugal. Porto is one of the oldest European centers, and its historical core was classified a World Heritage Site by UNESCO in 1996.

== Landmarks ==
Attraction	Period	Description	Picture	Citations
Centro Histórico do Porto		The Historic center of Porto, listed as a World Heritage Site in 1996, is the oldest area of the cities of Porto and Vila Nova de Gaia, with a 2000-year history. Built on the hill that dominates the mouth of the Douro river, it has a number of varied monuments in different styles.		
Cais da Ribeira		Ribeira Pier is a district located on the banks of Douro River in the historic center of Porto in the civil parish of Cedofeita, Santo Ildefonso, Sé, Miragaia, São Nicolau e Vitória. The streets are narrow in this area and buildings are in bright pastel colors. There is a historic monumental fountain from the 1780s featuring the coat of arms of Portugal in Ribeira Square.		
Ponte de Dom Luís I	1886	Dom Luís I Bridge is a railway, road and pedestrian double-deck metal arch bridge across the Douro River in Portugal connecting the cities of Porto and Vila Nova di Gaia. The bridge was constructed between 1881 and 1886. The length of its lower deck is 174 meters while upper deck is 391 meters; the width of both is 5 meters. The bridge has been listed as a Property of Public Interest since 1982.		
Ponte de Dona Maria Pia	1877	Maria Pia Bridge is a railway bridge built in 1876–1877 to connect the cities of Porto and Vila Nova de Gaia. The bridge is composed of a large parabolic arc. It is based on three pillars on the side of Gaia and two pillars on the side of the Porto. In 1991 rail traffic was discontinued because of its one-way direction and traffic speed restrictions. Maria Pia Bridge has been listed as a National Monument since 1982.		
Palácio de Bolsa	1909	The Stock Exchange Palace is a historical building in Neoclassical style constructed in the 19th century (construction started in 1842 and fully finished in 1909) near the Igreja de Sao Francisco. It was listed as a National Monument in 1982.		
Torre dos Clérigos	1763	Clérigos Tower is the 75-metre bell tower of Clerigos Church in Baroque style opened in 1763. It is a six-storey building with 225 steps. The church with its components has been classified as a National Monument since 1910.		
Funicular dos Guindais	1891	Guindais Funicular is a funicular railway in the civil parish of Cedofeita, Santo Ildefonso, Sé, Miragaia, São Nicolau e Vitória in Porto. Operated by Porto Metro, it connects Batalha and Riberia. The initial line was inaugurated in 1891, but due to the accident two years later, it ceased operations. A new funicular designed for the same place was opened in February 2004.		
Estação Ferroviária de São Bento	1916	São Bento is a historical railway station in city center of Porto known for its tiles depicting history of Portugal. The station was opened in 1916. Granite was mainly used in the construction of the three-storey U-shaped building. The station with its platform, tile panels and entrance to the tunnel was classified as a Property of Public Interest in 1997.		
Capela das Almas	18th century	The Chapel of Souls, also known as Chapel of Santa Catarina, is located in the civil parish of Santo Ildefonso of Porto. The building was constructed in the 18th century. The external walls were covered with blue-white ceramic tiles depicting episodes such as the Death of Saint Francis of Assisi and the Martyrdom of Santa Catarina by Eduardo Leite in 1929. The two-storey bell tower on the left side of the building is separated by a pillar and covered by a dome. The chapel was classified as a Property of Public Interest in 1993.		
Muralhas de D. Fernando	1336	The Walls of D. Fernando is a medieval castle located in the civil parish of Cedofeita, Santo Ildefonso, Sé, Miragaia, São Nicolau e Vitória. Construction of the walls started in 1336 during the reign of King D. Afonso IV in Gothic style. The castle has been listed as a National Monument since 1926.		

== Religious sites ==
Attraction	Period	Description	Picture	Citations
Igreja de Sao Francisco	15th century (completed)	The Church of São Francisco is a popular Gothic-style church located in the historic center of Porto. The construction of the church started in 1223 as a single-nave convent. After the king Ferdinand’s death in 1383, the reconstruction of the convent began; as a result it was enlarged to a three-nave church with five sections. The church has been classified as a National Monument since 1910.		
Sé do Porto	14th century	Porto Cathedral is a Catholic church located in the historic center of Porto. The building was constructed in the 14th century. However, it has been renovated and reconstructed several times, and has retained its original Gothic rose window. The Gothic cloisters of the cathedral are decorated with blue and white ceramic tiles from the 18th century. The Chapel of Saint Vincent, completed in the 16th century, is accessed through the cloisters. The cathedral has been classified as a National Monument since 1910.		
Igreja de Santa Clara	1457	The Church of Santa Clara is a Catholic church located in the parish of Sé in Porto. The construction of the church began in 1416 alongside the Santa Clara Convent for use by nuns of the Order of Poor Clares. However, the Order of Poor Clares settled in the church in 1427, it was completed in 1457. The building has been modified since then several times; for instance, in 1707–1715 new bedrooms were constructed, in 1729 the chapel was expanded, and in 1931 the fountain in the yard was demolished. The interior of the church is covered in gold and polychrome. Since 910, Igreja de Santa Clara has been classified as a National Monument. It is also classified as a World Heritage Site by UNESCO in 1996.		
Igreja do Carmo	1768	Carmo Church located near the Clerigos Tower dates back to the 18th century in Baroque-Rococo style. Carmo Church is twinned with the Carmelite Church on the west side. These churches are separated by a very narrow house built to make all contact impossible between nuns and monks. In the extension of the hospital's elevation, there is a panel of blue and white tiles designed by Silvestro Silvestri. The two buildings were classified together as National Monument in 2013.		

== Museums ==
Attraction	Period	Description	Picture	Citations
Museu Nacional de Soares dos Reis	1833	Soares dos Reis National Museum in the civil parish Miragaia of Porto is the first public art museum In Portugal founded in 1833 as a Porto Museum of Paintings and Prints. It was renamed in 1911 with the republican reforms and attained the status of National Museum in 1932. In 1940 the museum was moved from its former building to the Carrancas Palace, which was the residence of Manuel Mendes de Morais e Castro and built in 1795 in neoclassical style. There are collections of ceramics, sculpture, engraving, jewelry, furniture, gold and silverware, painting, textile and glassware displayed.		
Museu de Arte Contemporânea	1999	Serralves Art Museum is a contemporary museum located in the building designed by the architect Siza Vieira in the Serralves Park in 1999. The building is constructed in a longitudinal manner from North to South, its main U-shaped body's wings are separated by a patio. The L-shaped part features the second patio and is the main access to the museum through the garden. Concrete and steel have been used in the construction of the building. Its facade is covered with granite and painted plaster.		
Centro Português de Fotografia	1997	The Portuguese Center of Photography was founded in 1997 by the Ministry of Culture. The museum is located in the building constructed in 1767 in the historic center of Porto and used to serve as a prison (Cadeia da Relacao) until 1974. The building was restored and its former cells have been transformed into galleries.		
Casa do Infante	1324	House of the Prince is a museum and one of the oldest buildings in the city of Porto. The house was built in 1324 as a royal customhouse. Its name is derived from legends suggesting that Prince Henry the Navigator was born here in 1394.		
Museu do Futebol Clube do Porto	2013	FC Porto Museum is a museum dedicated to the history of Portuguese football club Porto. The museum was opened in September 2013 on the occasion of the 120th anniversary of FC Porto under the east stand of the Estádio do Dragão (Dragon Stadium). The museum covering 8000 square meters and 27 thematic areas, displays over 2000 items as trophies, documents, medals, uniforms and works of art.		

== Parks and gardens ==
Attraction	Period	Description	Picture	Citations
Jardins do Palácio de Cristal	1860	Crystal Palace Gardens is a green rest place in Massarelos parish of Porto. The garden was designed by the German landscaper Emil David (1839–1873) during the construction of the Crystal Palace. There are Virginia Tulip trees, Acer, Lime tree, magnolia, camelia, palm and araucaria in the garden.		
Parque da Cidade do Porto	1993	Porto City Park is the largest urban park in Portugal covering an area of 83 hectares. The park was designed by the landscape architect Sidónio Pardal and opened in 1993.		
Jardim do Infante dom Henrique		The garden of Prince Henry the Navigator in front of the Palácio da Bolsa is a popular small park for picnics and sunning.		

== Others ==
Attraction	Period	Description	Picture	Citations
Sea Life Porto	2009	The Sea Life Porto is a public-access aquarium, built and operated by the group Merlin Entertainments. It was opened in June 2009 and located in the City Park of Porto.		

== Nearby places ==
Attraction	Period	Description	Picture	Citations
Igreja da Santa Casa da Misericórdia de Penafiel	17th century	Church of the Santa Casa da Misericórdia is a 17th-century church in the civil parish of Penafiel in Porto district. Its two side chapels were added in 1748 by Nicolau Nasoni. The administrative building of the church has hosted a museum called Sacred Art Museum of Santa Casa da Misericórdia de Penafiel since 2004.		
Monastery of Serra do Pilar	1538	Monastery of Serra do Pilar is at the top of the Pilar mountain range (called Serra do Pilar), in the parish of Santa Marinha, city and municipality of Vila Nova de Gaia, Porto district. The church's construction began in 1538 according to the order of John III of Portugal in order to transfer the monks of Grijo to a new place after the Salvador de Grijó Monastery was ruined. The church has a circular shape covered with a dome surrounded by a balcony. The church has been classified as Property of Public Interest since 1935.		

== See also ==
- Porto
- Tourism in Portugal
