= Praça D. João I =

Square in Porto, Portugal

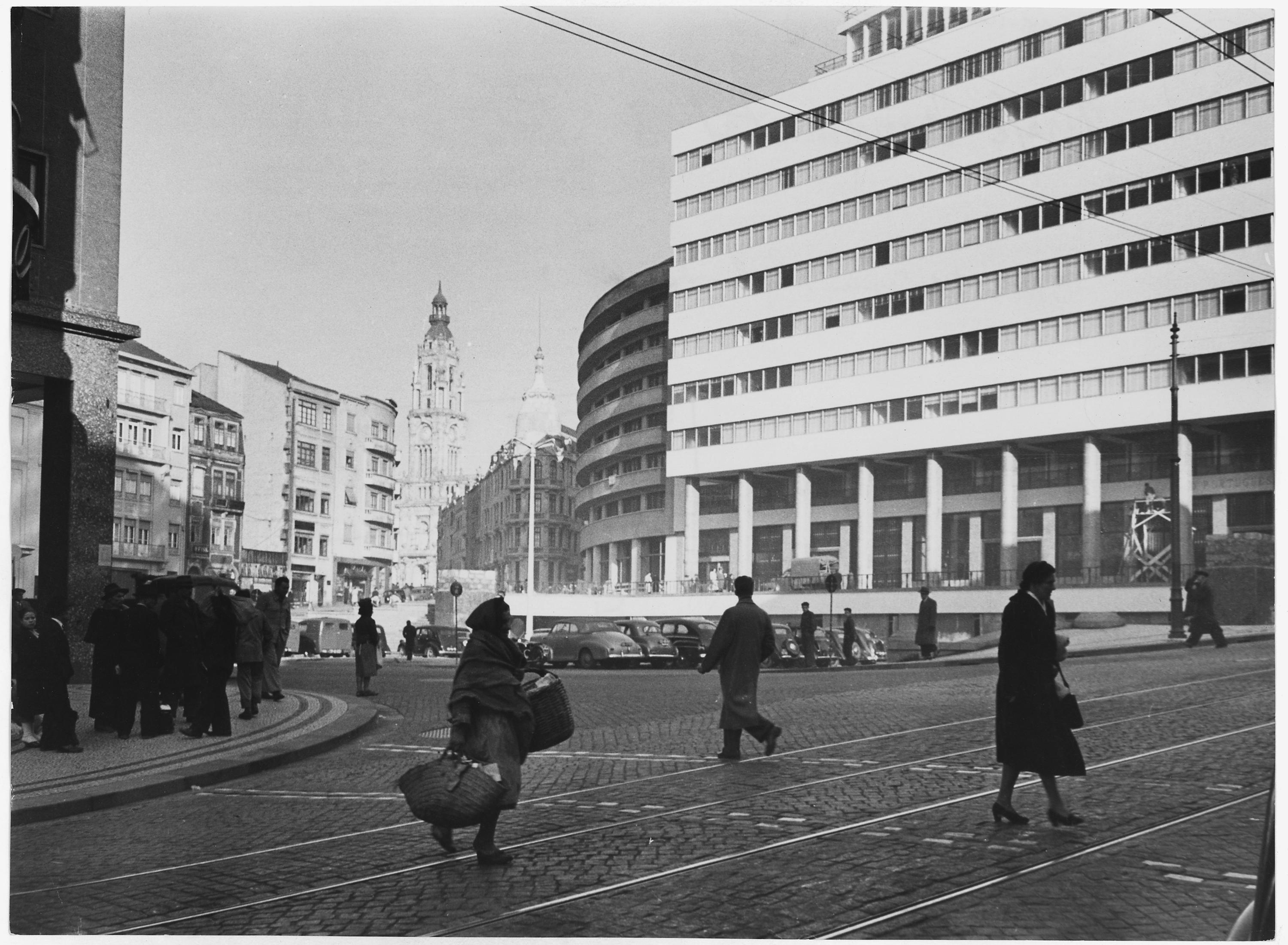
Praça D. João I during the 1950s.

Praça D. João I (John I Square) is a square located in the parish of Santo Ildefonso, in the center of the city of Porto, Portugal.

The square is named in honor of John I of Portugal (1358–1433), the tenth king of Portugal and the first of the Avis dynasty, who married Philippa of Lancaster in the city of Porto in 1387.

== Points of interest ==
"Corcéis" statues by João Fragoso in Praça D. João I.

- "Corcéis", two statues by the sculptor João Fragoso.
- Rivoli Theatre, inaugurated in 1913, with a frieze by Henrique Moreira.
- Atlantic Palace, inaugurated in 1950, and current headquarters of the Portuguese Commercial Bank.
- Rialto Building, by the architect Rogério de Azevedo, inaugurated in 1948 and, at the time, known as a "skyscraper" for being the tallest in the city.

== See also ==
- Ribeira Square
- Liberdade Square
- Tourist attractions in Porto
