= Stock Exchange Palace =

Stock Exchange Palace may refer to:

- Palazzo Mezzanotte
- Palácio da Bolsa
