= 2026 Portuguese housing protests =

- Part of the 2026 European unrest
- Encampments in Rossio, October 2026
- Date: March 2026 – present Main: 10 October 2026 – present
- Location: Portugal
- Caused by: Affordable housing crisis; Cost-of-living crisis; Property speculation; Landlord harassment and forced evictions; Police brutality
- Goals: Enforcement of the right to housing; Access to affordable housing; Protection of tenants against abusive practices and price hikes; Ban on real estate investment funds purchasing residential properties
- Methods: Demonstrations, civil disobedience, civil resistance, protest camps
- Status: Ongoing: Calls for a general strike

Parties
| Tenants unions; Labour unions; Municipal groups; Civil organizations; Casa para Viver; Movimento pela Habitação; Porta a Porta; Political parties; Communist Party; Left Bloc; LIVRE; Collectives; Coletivo Comunista Revolucionário; Unaffiliated protesters | Government of Portugal; Ministry of Home Affairs; Polícia de Segurança Pública; National Republican Guard; Political parties; Social Democratic Party; CDS – People's Party |

Casualties
- Injuries: 144 protesters, 11 police officers, 3 undercover police agents (as of 4 November 2026)
- Arrested: 93 (as of 4 November 2026)

A series of protests are taking place in Portugal in reaction to the country's ongoing affordable housing costs crisis. Demonstrations started as early as March 2026 protesting rising housing costs, but escalated to larger and ongoing protests after the police violently intervened on an encampment on 15 October 2026 in Porto, injuring over 30 protesters. In reaction, the protests grew to other cities around the country, leading to dozens of arrests and over 100 injured protesters.

== Background ==
Housing costs and rental prices had been soaring for many years in Portugal, particularly in major urban centers, as wages have not increased to the same extent. Housing construction in the country collapsed following the bursting of the Portuguese property bubble in 2008 and the subsequent real estate crisis, causing a housing shortage in places where it was needed the most. Since 2015, housing prices have increased 180%, 70% just since 2021, because of several factors, from a big increase in population, due to a wave of immigration, a stagnation in new construction, burdened by heavy bureaucracy, to foreign speculation investments.

The 2026 protests arise in a context of contestation of the new rental legislation, criticized by left-wing parties, who call it the "eviction law" and "rental accelerator". The Secretary-General of the Socialist Party, José Luís Carneiro, accused the government of making "an incomprehensible alliance" with far-right party Chega in the new rental law.

== Timeline ==
=== Early demonstrations ===
In March 2026, over 90 organizations connected to the Casa para Viver platform held multiple protests across 16 cities to protest rising renting costs and forced evictions. These organizations, which include trade unions, tenants unions, and municipal groups, demanded the government to put the over 723,000 vacant properties in the country to use for the people. Protesters criticized the recent budget proposal of the government that defined a "moderate rent" that can be as high as €2,300 per month. Isabel Mendes Lopes, of the LIVRE party, accused Prime Minister Luís Montenegro of "living in a bubble".

On 10 October, thousands of protesters marched through the city center of Lisbon against the rising cost of living and housing.

=== Porto encampments ===
On 10 October, in Porto, a camp was set up by Movimento pela Habitação (Movement for Housing) in Praça D. João I. Protesters described the action "not as a leisure activity or camping trip, but as an act of political desperation". On 12 October, police intervened to remove the over 50 tents that had been set up. The city council of Porto described the action as proportional.

On 14 October, the movement held a demonstration of reportedly over 500 people and collectively voted to set up the encampment again with at least 20 tents. The decisions to remain every night were held via open popular assemblies.

On 15 October, around 3 in the morning, the police violently intervened after protesters formed a peaceful human chain and chanted Grândola, Vila Morena. Movimento pela Habitação denounced "the use of extreme, disproportionate and unjustified force" and counted 37 injured, two of whom were seriously injured, including a person with a disability. Santo António Hospital confirmed that it had admitted seven people, five with minor injuries, a man with an epicranial hematoma and a woman with a fractured radius. A protester filed a criminal complaint and a report to the Inspeção-Geral da Administração Interna (IGAI, General Inspectorate of Home Affairs). The IGAI then opened an administrative process to determine the circumstances of the intervention. The police reported that one of its agents was injured and sent a report with images of the protest to the Public Prosecutor's Office.

In reaction, later that day, the movement called for a new gathering in Praça D. João I, which brought together between 2,500 and 3,500 people, with slogans such as "Menos bastão, mais habitação" ("Less batons, more housing") and "O Porto não está à venda" ("Porto is not for sale"). Protesters also called for the resignation of the mayor. The demonstrators marched to Aliados, where some climbed the ramps leading to the City Hall.

On 20 October, police intervened to remove all tents and protesters. On the same night protesters returned to demonstrate on the location. The organizers projected a live video call was projected between the Spanish encampments from Almería, Granada, Madrid, Pontevedra, and Vigo.

On 25 October, the police informed the campers that they could remain and spend the night in Praça de D. João I, provided they dismantled their tents. The warning was given in the presence of the movement's lawyer, Tiago Machado. In a new vote, the protesters decided to keep the structures, forming a human chain around the camp. Around 2:02 am, the Special Police Unit began to intervene in the square to demobilize the participants. The police deployment included officers with shields and canine teams. The operation lasted just over ten minutes, during which the officers removed the protesters from the tent area and dismantled the camp. Arrests were made, although a definitive official count is still pending. After the intervention, several hundred people moved to Praça General Humberto Delgado, in front of Porto City Hall, chanting slogans against the police action. At 2:40 am, one person was receiving medical attention, while other participants identified themselves as injured in front of the journalists present. A spokesperson for the Porto encampment presented a preliminary count of 37 injured, in addition to five people who were still receiving medical assistance and whose state of health was unknown at the time. The representative also mentioned two detainees, warning that some people had not yet been located by the movement. The Lusa news agency also reported the use of an electric shock device against at least one protester, in the context of the police intervention. The organization criticized the use of force and announced that it intended to maintain the mobilization for housing.

On 28 October, protesters reinstalled the tents in Praça D. João I. Around midnight, authorities requested that the camp be dismantled and people leave the site. The tents were removed but participants decided to stay the night.

On 1 November, police intervened on the protesters, injuring over 40 people, including 10 police officers and three undercover agents. An undercover police agent pointed his gun at protesters.

=== Lisbon encampments ===
Protest for housing in Rossio before police intervention, October 2026

On 17 September, the movement spread to Lisbon, where around 200 tents were set up in Rossio.

On 20 October, around 5 in morning, the police violently intervened to remove all the tents and 55 protesters were arrested. On the same night, a new demonstration was organized gathering thousands of protesters. Several musicians held free concerts there in solidarity such as Ana Moura, Dino d'Santiago, Nenny, Samuel Úria, and Xutos & Pontapés. Protesters set up once again an encampment on the same location.

On 21 October, several hundred demonstrators returned to continue their protests for housing. During a public assembly, a proposal to reinstall the tents and spend the night in the square was approved. The organizers had previously expressed doubts about the security conditions necessary to resume the encampment. At night a man entered the area occupied by the participants, displaying an Israeli flag. The man was surrounded and pushed away by demonstrators, and the police intervened to remove him from the site. During the incident, slogans such as "we are peaceful" and "we are all antifascists" were heard.

On 24 October, the organizers counted approximately 130 tents set up in Rossio Square and stated that around 300 people intended to spend the night there. The organizers announced that they would collectively decide how to react to any police intervention. In the early morning of 25 October, the police again ordered the removal of the tents. After repeated warnings, the demonstrators decided to form a human chain to prevent the removal of the structures. Around 1:30 AM, the police surrounded the square and maintained an intervention force in its vicinity. Around 2 AM, police officers advanced on the participants to remove the tents. The Lusa news agency described moments of tension, including batons being used on demonstrators and the throwing of firecrackers, the origin of which was not identified in the news report. Some participants were dispersed towards Figueira Square. Diário de Notícias, which covered the events on site, reported several arrests and injuries to people during the intervention, including participants who fell to the ground. In one of its early morning updates, the newspaper observed about a dozen people handcuffed in Praça de D. Pedro IV, at least one of whom had visible injuries.

On 26 October, protesters organized vigils in outside the Campus of Justice to follow the judicial interrogations of the demonstrators detained by the police.

On 27 October, thousands of protesters gathered outside the Parliament while the national budget for 2027 was discussed.

On 30 October, the police ordered the removal of children's playing "tents", stating they were illegal.

On 31 October, the police intervened on protesters, injuring over 30 protesters, with 10 having to be taken to the hospital.

On 1 November, the police fined cars that passed by Rossio and honked in solidarity with the protesters.

On 14 November, approximately 100,000 people protested across Portugal, making it the largest nationwide housing demonstration in the country's history. Lisbon alone saw around 60,000 protesters.

=== Other protests ===
Demonstrations also took place Aveiro, Braga, Coimbra, and Funchal, under the slogan "We can no longer live like this" (Não dá mais para viver assim). In Faro, around 200 people gathered in solidarity with the encampment in Porto and to protest against high house prices. In Évora, over 100 people demonstrated in from of the city hall in solidarity with the police brutality exerted on the protesters in Lisbon and Porto. In Beja, around 50 protesters gathered in the Praça da República in defence of the right to housing and in solidarity with those camped there. In Leiria, around 50 people responded to a call from the Porta a Porta movement, gathering in Largo da República. Participants protested the police violence in Lisbon and Porto and demanded measures to improve access to housing. Demonstrations also took place in Ponta Delgada, Setúbal, and Viana do Castelo.

== Government response and reactions ==
=== Political reactions ===
- Prime Minister Luís Montenegro acknowledged that "protesting is legitimate", but asked parties and movements not to "import climates of instability and dissent to Portugal that have no support in Portuguese society".
- The Minister of Home Affairs, Luís Neves, stated that "there is law and order that must be respected" and that the police's action was legitimate. Later he declared that "the camps are over", recognizing, however, the legitimacy of the right to demonstrate.
- The Mayor of Porto, Pedro Duarte, considered the cause "legitimate and just" and deeply regretted that the police had to intervene in that way, arguing that "they were forced to".
- President of Portugal, António José Seguro, said he understood "very well" the concerns of the protesters, but asked that the demonstrations respect the law.
- The Socialist Party, through José Luís Carneiro, asked the Minister of Home Affairs for "urgent explanations" on the proportionality of the intervention and stated that the protests prove "the failure of the Government's housing policy".
- LIVRE and the Left Bloc condemned the disproportionate use of force and demanded explanations; the Left Bloc sent questions to the Ministry of Home Affairs.
- José Manuel Pureza, from the Left Bloc, said that "more and more people are unable to pay their bills, while a small group of people are making astronomical profits".
- Chega considered the actions of the police correct and stated that "Portugal is not a country of tents in the street".
- The Liberal Initiative accused the Portuguese Communist Party and Left Bloc of "instigating the escalation" of the demonstrations.
- The CDS – People's Party presented a motion of congratulations in the Assembly of the Republic for the intervention by the police.

=== "Não sejam egoístas" incident ===
On 15 October 2026, Prime Minister Luís Montenegro told protesters from Movimento pela Habitação "não sejam egoístas" (don't be selfish). This caused public backlash, with some protesters and public figures pointing out the fact that the Prime Minister owns 55 properties.

=== Legal responses ===
On 2 November, the Administrative Court of the Lisbon Circle agreed with the summons presented by Renata Cambra, one of the spokespersons for the protests. The court stated that it was allowed for protesters to set up their tents in Rossio even after 00:30 am, a point which police had used to justify their violent interventions. A lawyer of the protesters sad that the police "has to start to behave in accordance with the law and the Constitution, just as the protesters also have to make their right, which has now been recognized, to demonstrate, compatible with all the others".

== See also ==
- 2026 Spanish housing protests
- List of protests in the 21st century
