= FC Porto (disambiguation) =

FC Porto is a Portuguese sports club, best known for its association football team.

FC Porto may also refer to:

- FC Porto B, the reserve football team of FC Porto
- FC Porto Juniors, the youth football teams of FC Porto
- FC Porto (basketball), the basketball section of FC Porto
- FC Porto (billiards), the billiards section of FC Porto
- FC Porto (goalball), part of the adapted sports section of FC Porto
- FC Porto (handball), the handball section of FC Porto
- FC Porto (roller hockey), the roller hockey section of FC Porto
- FC Porto (Superleague Formula team), a car racing team (discontinued)
- FC Porto (swimming), the swimming section of FC Porto
- W52–FC Porto, a road cycling team sponsored by FC Porto

FC Porto may also refer to derivative or affiliated clubs:

- FC Porto de Macau, an affiliated club from Macau
- FC Porto Taibesse, an association football club from East Timor
- FC Porto Real, an association football club from São Tomé and Príncipe
