= FC Porto Museum =

Football museum in Porto, Portugal

- Museu do Futebol Clube do Porto by BMG
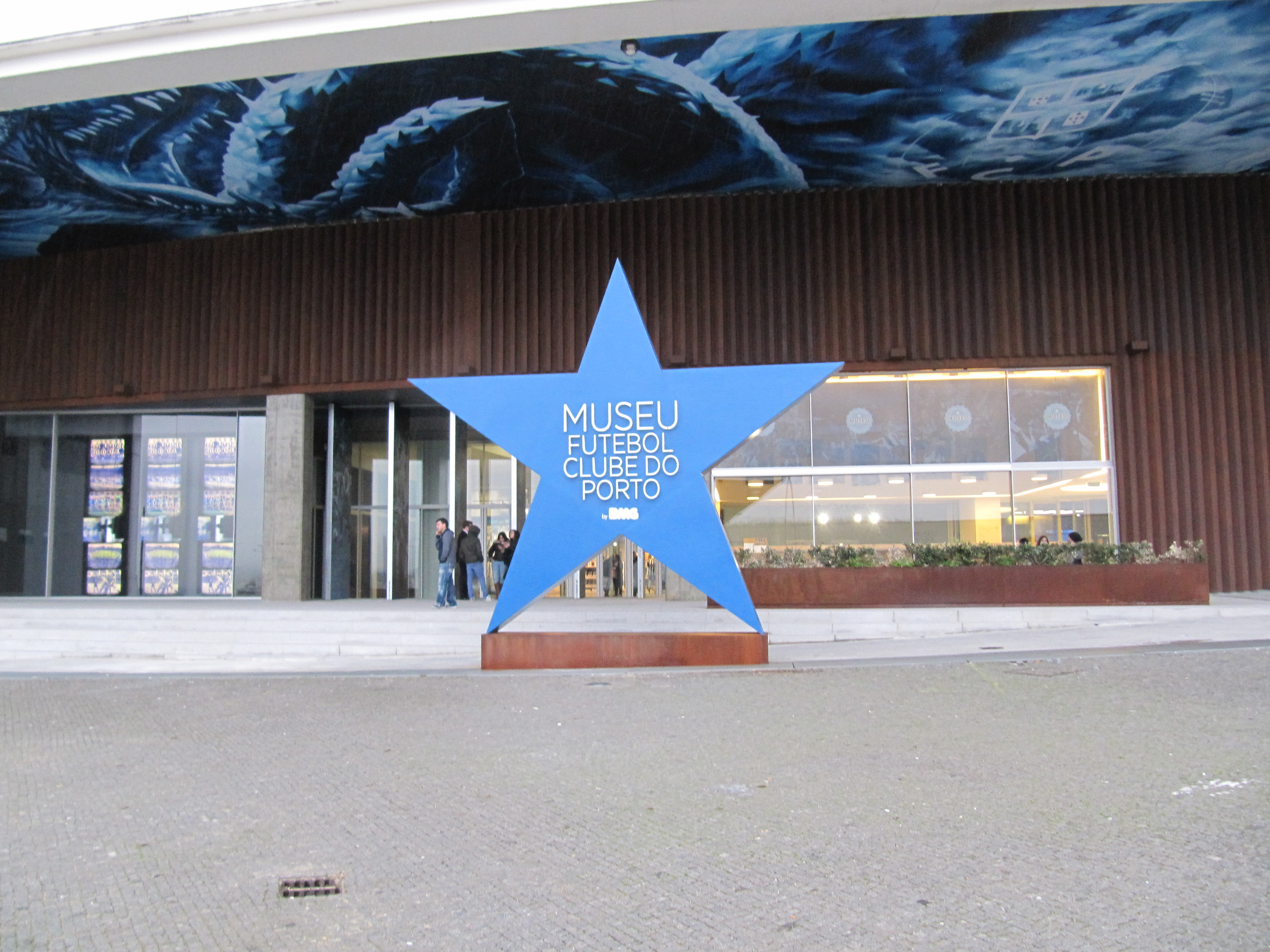
- Established: 28 September 2013; 12 years ago
- Location: Estádio do Dragão, Porto, Portugal
- Coordinates: 41°9′39″N 8°34′58″W
- Type: Sports (mainly football)
- Public transit access: Metro – Estádio do Dragão (lines,, and); Bus – 401 and 806
- Parking: On site (free for museum tour pack)
- Website: Official website

The FC Porto Museum, officially known as FC Porto Museum by BMG (Portuguese: Museu do Futebol Clube do Porto by BMG) for sponsorship reasons, is a museum located in Porto, dedicated to the history of the Portuguese association football club FC Porto. It was inaugurated on 28 September 2013, on occasion of the club's 120th anniversary, and opened its doors to the general public on 26 October.

Conceived and constructed by Sibina Partners (Barcelona) and MUSE (London), the museum occupies an area of almost 8,000 square metres (86,000 sq ft) under the east stand of the Estádio do Dragão. It contains 27 thematic areas with a strong interactive and technologic component, which showcase the club's historical events, matches, titles, managers and players, not only in football but in other sections, including women's football, handball, basketball, goalball, volleyball, billiards, futsal, swimming and roller hockey. The central and dominant space features the club's large collection of domestic football silverware as well as its seven international trophies.

The museum also includes an auditorium, a club store, a coffeehouse, and spaces for educational services and temporary exhibitions. The Valquíria Dragão (Dragon Valkyrie), an exclusive work by Portuguese artist Joana Vasconcelos, which incorporates club textiles and trophies, welcomes visitors at the museum's entrance.
