= Casa para Viver =

Portuguese affordable housing movement

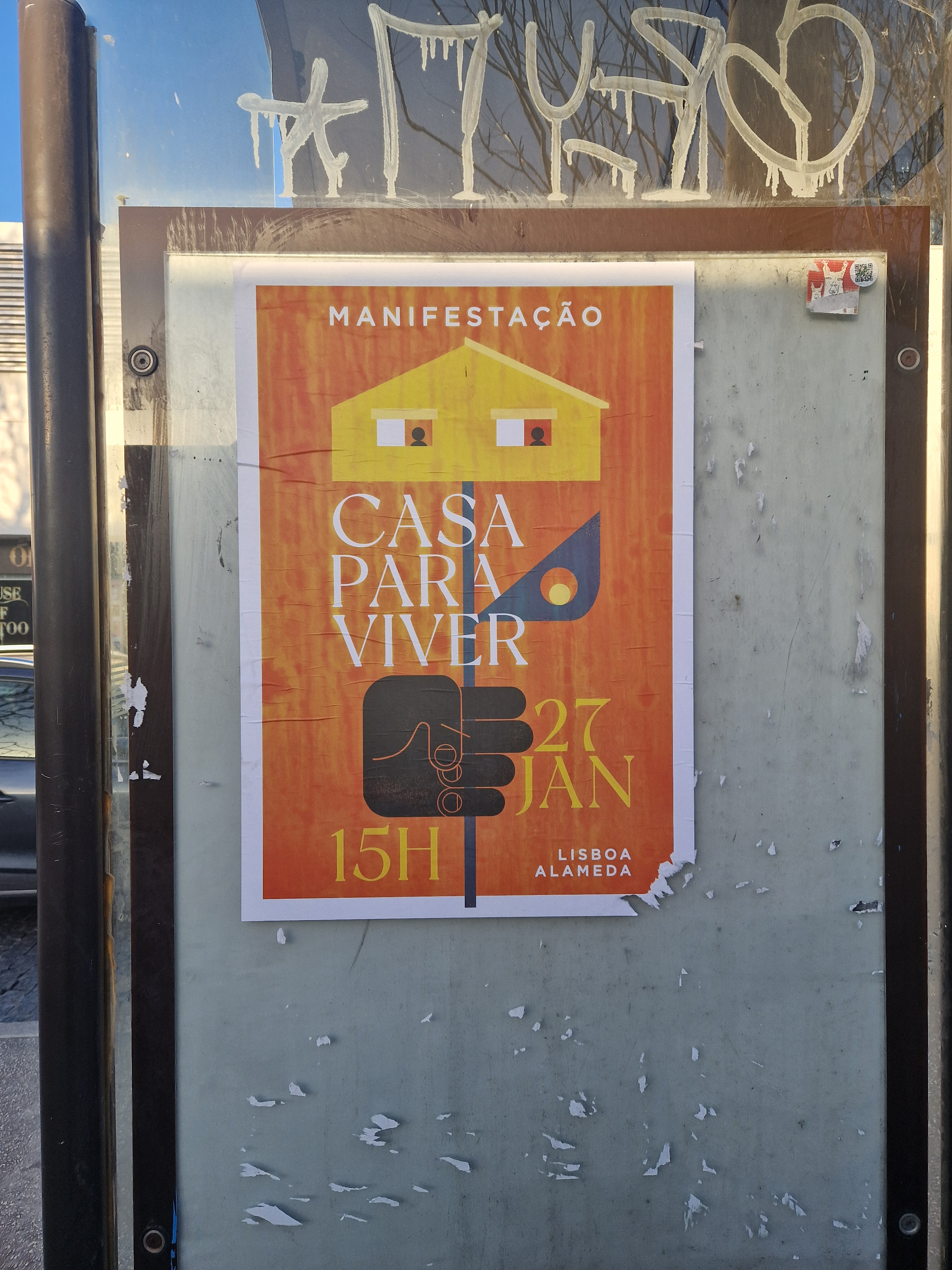
- Formation: 2023
- Official language: Portuguese
- Website: www.casaparaviver.pt

Casa para Viver (English: Housing to Live) is a Portuguese movement promoting affordable housing in Portugal. The group has been involved in organizing and mobilizing the ongoing housing crisis protests in Lisbon.

== Activities ==
In September 2023, Casa para Viver organized several demonstration in protest of the housing crises in multiple cities across the country. In October 2023, the group met with the Minister of Housing, Marina Gonçalves, demanding the immediate suspension of evictions and other proposals to combat the current housing crisis.

In September and October 2024, Casa para Viver organized demonstrations which counted with the participation of thousands of protesters.

Protester holding a sign reading "House? Only on Sims" at a demonstration in Lisbon organized by Casa para Viver, September 2023.

In June 2025, Casa para Viver organized a weekend of action across 13 cities in Portugal. The platform presented a twelve-point "emergency list of demands" that included rent control, longer leases, limits on short-term rentals, a ban on evictions without alternative housing, the use of abandoned building for social housing, and others. A similar initiative was repeated in March 2026.

In July 2026, the group delivered an open letter to the Minister of Housing Miguel Pinto Luz criticizing "the attack on tenants" in a proposal to change the leasing law.

In September 2026, the group organized a vigil in front of the Assembly of the Republic in protest of the new eviction law and rising rents.

In October 2026, Casa para Viver condemned the police brutality used against the protesters in Rossio. The group called for further mobilizations on 27 October and 14 November, including a demonstration in front of the Assembly of the Republic on the day of the general vote on the state budget.

== See also ==
- 2026 Portuguese housing protests
