= Sea Life =

Chain of aquarium attractions

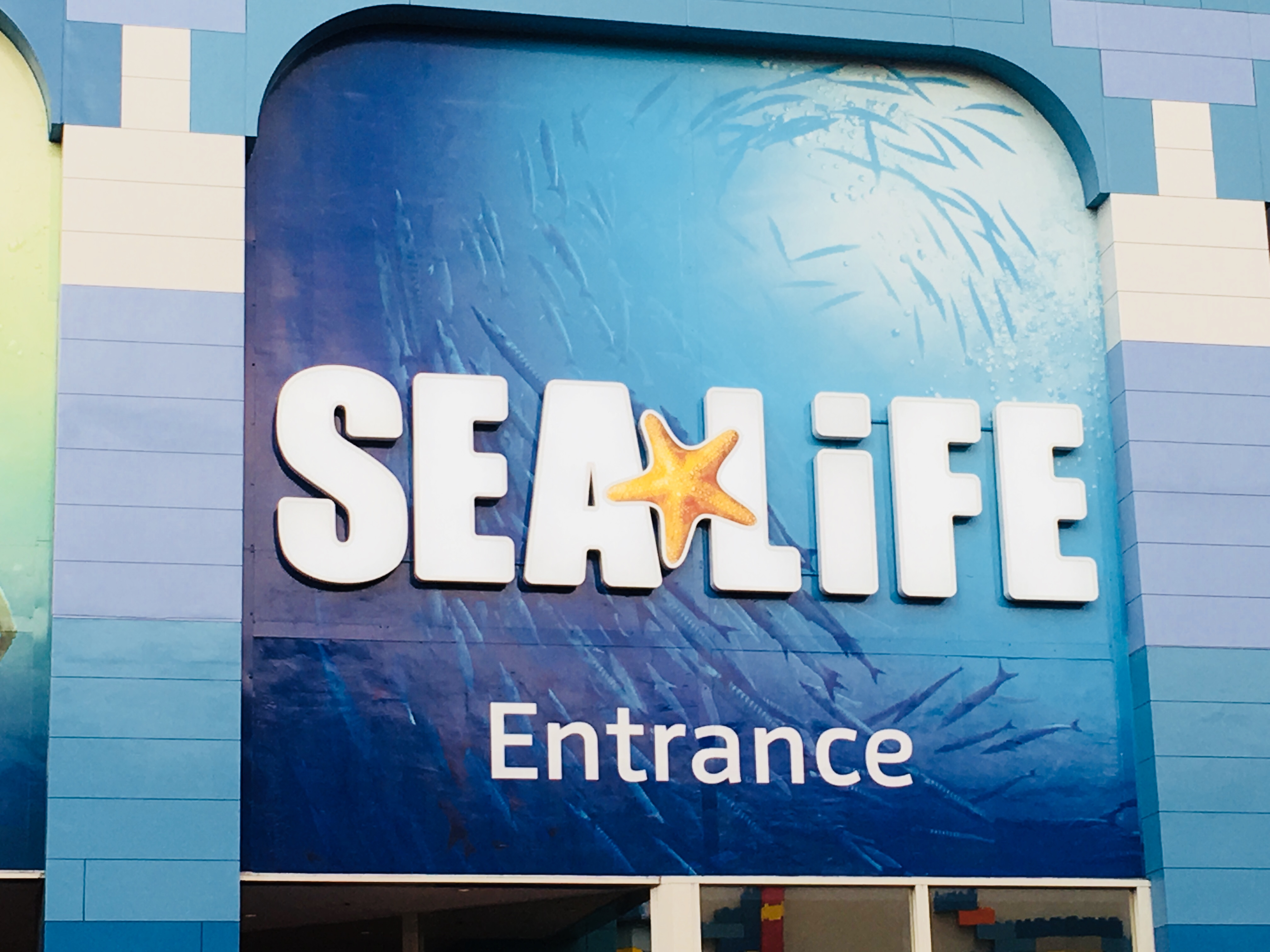
Sea Life logo, Nagoya

Sea Life is a chain of commercial sea life-themed aquarium attractions. As of April 2017 there are 53 Sea Life attractions (including standalone Sea Life centres, mini Sea Life features within resort theme parks, and Legoland submarine rides) around the world. The chain is owned by the British company Merlin Entertainments.

== History ==
Some of the aquariums now called Sea Life predate this rebrand and existed under different designations prior to their consolidation. The original named attraction was Sea Life Centre in Oban, Scotland, which opened in 1979. By 1992, nine other Sea Life units were opened.

== Locations ==
=== North America ===
==== United States ====
- Sea Life Legoland California
- Sea Life Arizona
- Sea Life at Mall of America
- Sea Life Caverns at Marine Life
- Sea Life Charlotte-Concord
- Sea Life Grapevine
- Sea Life Kansas City
- Sea Life Michigan
- Sea Life New Jersey
- Sea Life Orlando
- Sea Life San Antonio

=== Europe ===
==== United Kingdom ====
Locations of Sea Life centres in the United Kingdom (excluding those at resort theme parks)

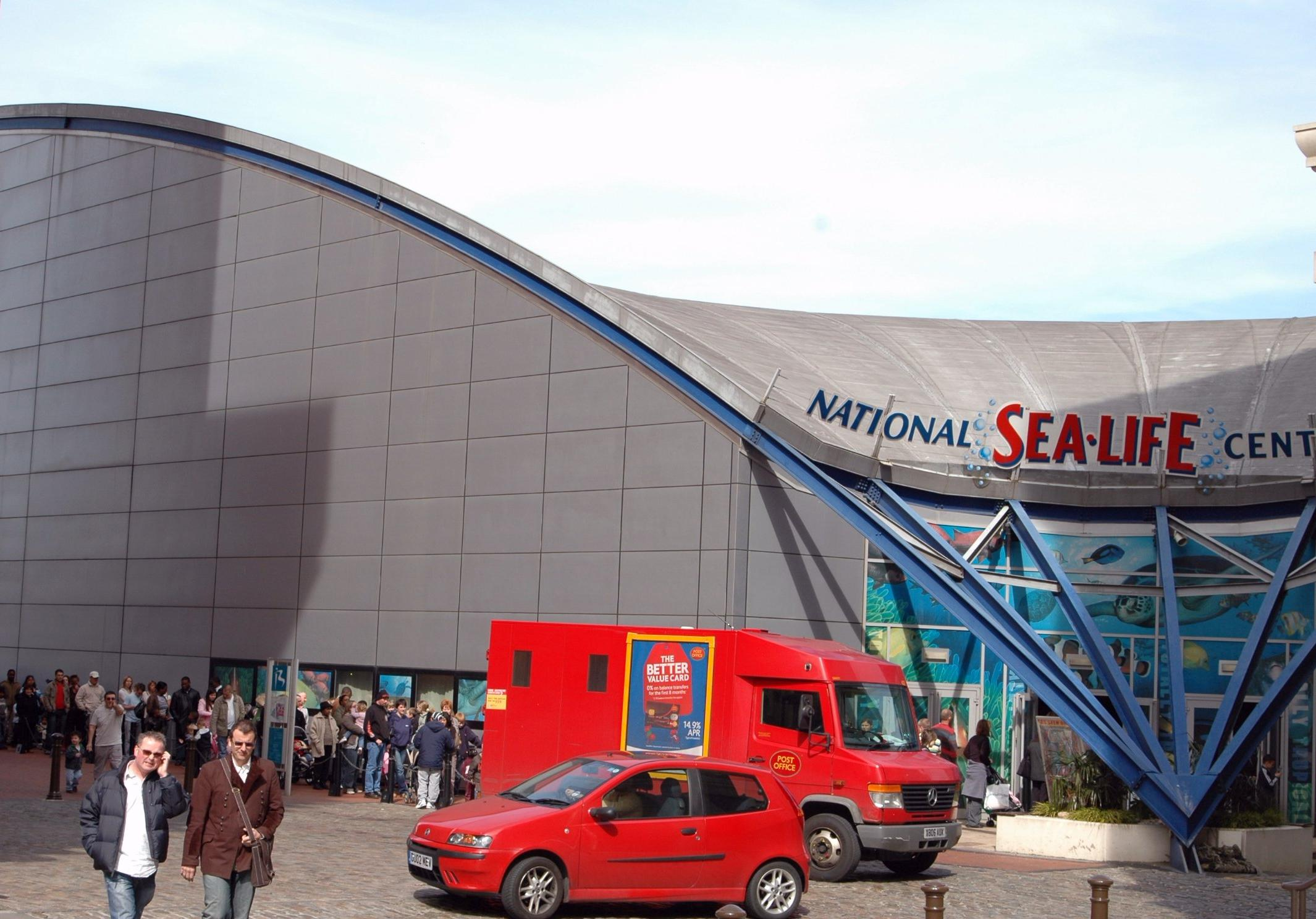
National Sea Life Centre in Birmingham

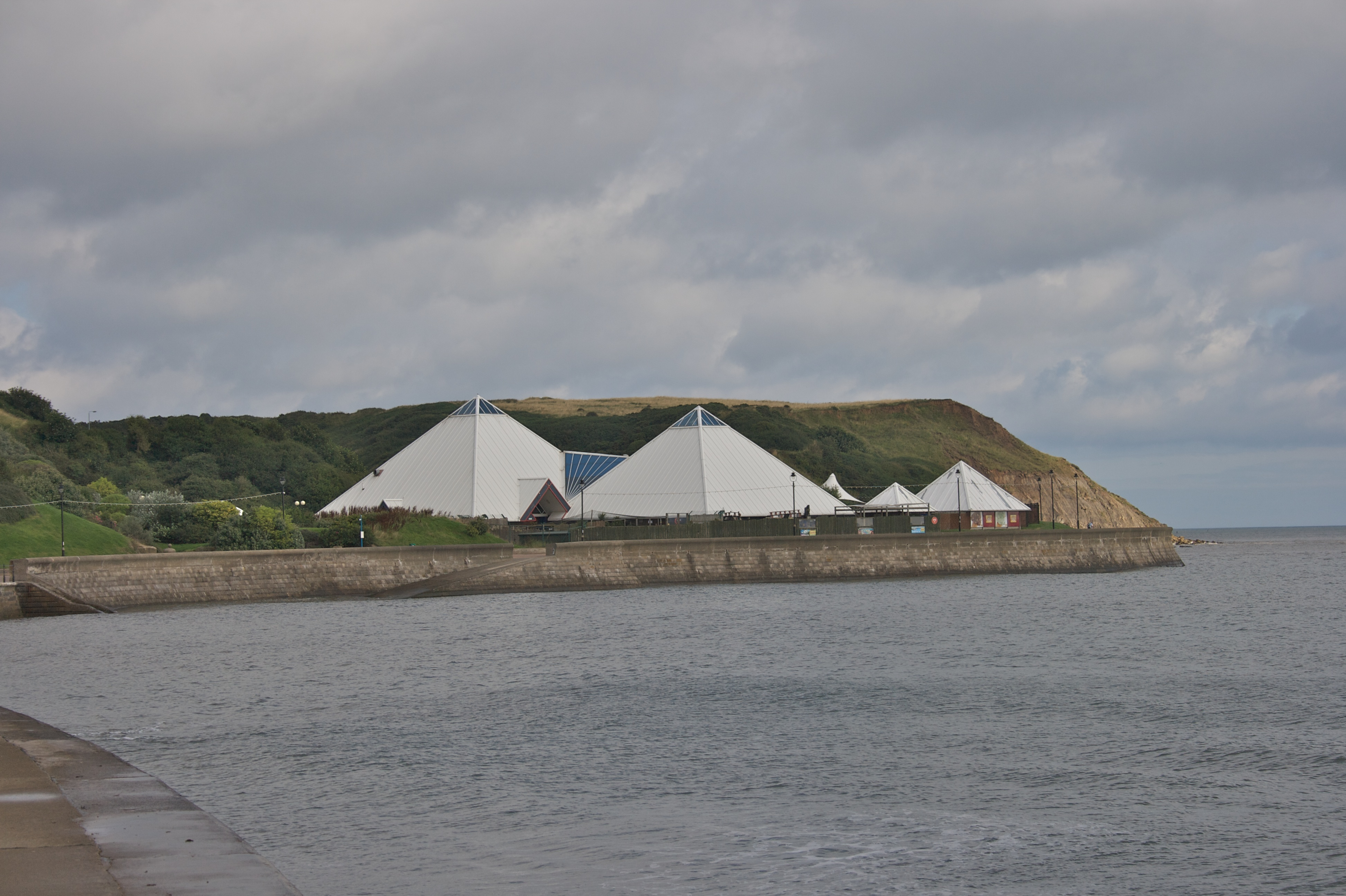
Scarborough Sea Life centre

- Alton Towers Resort, Staffordshire, England – Sharkbait Reef by Sea Life
- Chessington World of Adventures, England – Chessington Sea Life Centre
- Cornish Seal Sanctuary, Gweek, England
- Legoland Windsor Resort, England – Atlantis Submarine Voyage
- National Sea Life Centre, Birmingham, England
- Sea Life Blackpool, Blackpool, England
- Sea Life Brighton, Brighton, England
- Sea Life Great Yarmouth, Great Yarmouth, England
- Sea Life Hunstanton, Hunstanton, England
- Sea Life Loch Lomond, Loch Lomond, Scotland
- Sea Life London Aquarium, London, England
- Sea Life Manchester, Manchester, England
- Sea Life Scarborough, Scarborough, England
- Sea Life Weymouth, Weymouth, England

==== Germany ====
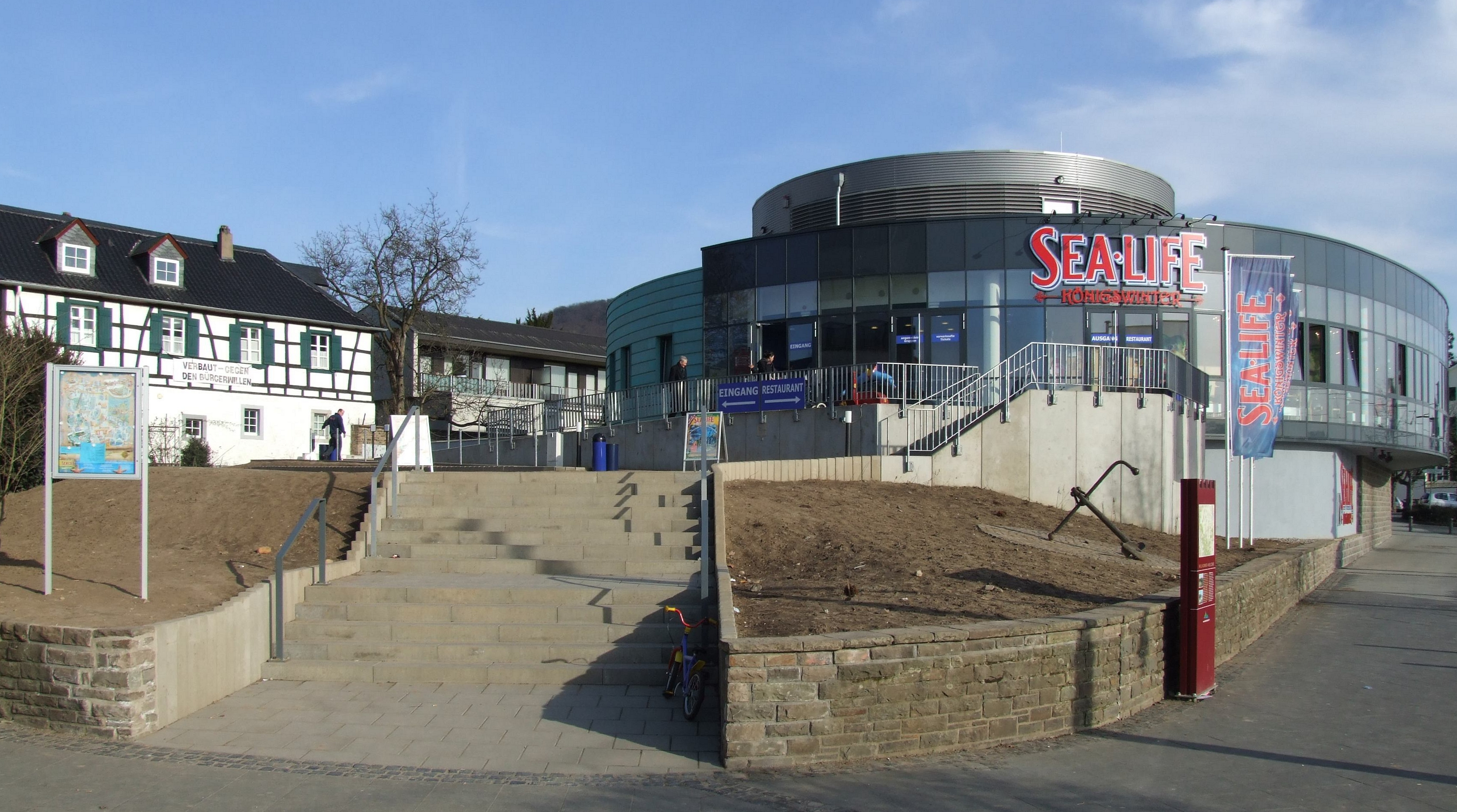
Sea Life centre in Königswinter, Germany

- Sea Life Hanover, Hanover
- Sea Life Konstanz, Konstanz
- Sea Life Munich, Munich
- Sea Life Oberhausen, Oberhausen, This is the largest Sea Life Centre in Germany. This was the home of Paul, the octopus who correctly predicted the German national football team's results at the world cup of 2010, until his death in October 2010.
- Sea Life Speyer, Speyer
- Sea Life Timmendorfer Strand, Timmendorfer Strand

==== Others ====
- Gardaland, Italy
- Legoland Billund, Billund, Denmark
- Sea Life Benalmádena, Benalmádena, Spain
- Sea Life Blankenberge, Blankenberge, Belgium
- Sea Life Helsinki, Helsinki, Finland
- Sea Life Paris, Serris, France
- Sea Life Porto, Porto, Portugal
- Sea Life Scheveningen, The Hague, Netherlands

=== Asia ===
In November 2015, Merlin Entertainments announced that over the next 10 years it would invest £50 million in India, some of which will be used to open Sea Life centres. In January 2017, Merlin Entertainments Indian subsidiary stated that it was in discussion with real estate firms to open Sea Life centres in multiple cities in India.

- Sea Life Bangkok, Thailand
- Sea Life Busan, South Korea
- Sea Life Nagoya, Japan
- Sea Life Malaysia, Malaysia
- Sea Life Shanghai, China
- Sea Life Sichuan, China (expected opening in 2024, as of 2021)

=== Oceania ===
- Kelly Tarlton's Sea Life Aquarium, Auckland, New Zealand
- Sea Life Melbourne, Australia
- Sea Life Sunshine Coast, Australia
- Sea Life Sydney, Australia

==== Former sites ====
- Berlin
- Rhyl, Wales – Sea Life Rhyl – sold to SeaQuarium chain, permanently closed in November 2023
- Cuxhaven
- Hastings, England – Sea Life Hastings – sold and now belongs to the Blue Reef Aquarium chain
- Jesolo Sea Life
- Tynemouth, England – Tynemouth Sea Life centre – opened in 1994. In 1999 it was sold to Aspro Parks (Aspro Ocio Group) and now belongs to the Blue Reef Aquarium chain
- Oban, Scotland – Scottish Sea Life Sanctuary – closed in October 2018
- St Andrews, Scotland – sold and now operates as the St Andrews Aquarium
- Königswinter, Germany – closed in December 2022
- Weston-super-Mare, United Kingdom – sold to SeaQuarium Ltd which operated it until its closure in 2019
- Bray, County Wicklow, Ireland – closed in December 2023
- Manly, Australia - Manly Sea Life Sanctuary – Closed in January 2018
- Sea Life Istanbul, Turkey – Closed on 1 January 2025

== Controversies ==
Sea Life centres have been criticised over animal welfare, with the Marine Conservation Society calling a 30% per annum mortality rate "disturbing." The charity Freedom for Animals has criticised Sea Life over their conservation claims and also for the presence of beluga whales at attractions.

In the UK, a high-profile campaign involving Freedom for Animals, Born Free Foundation, politicians, and members of the public, led the aquarium to announce the closure of its controversial gentoo penguin enclosure, which held fifteen penguins with no access to fresh air or daylight in the basement of Sea Life London Aquarium.
