= Portuguese Centre of Photography =

Archival institution in Portugal

Coordinates: 41°8′40.76″N 8°36′56.8″W

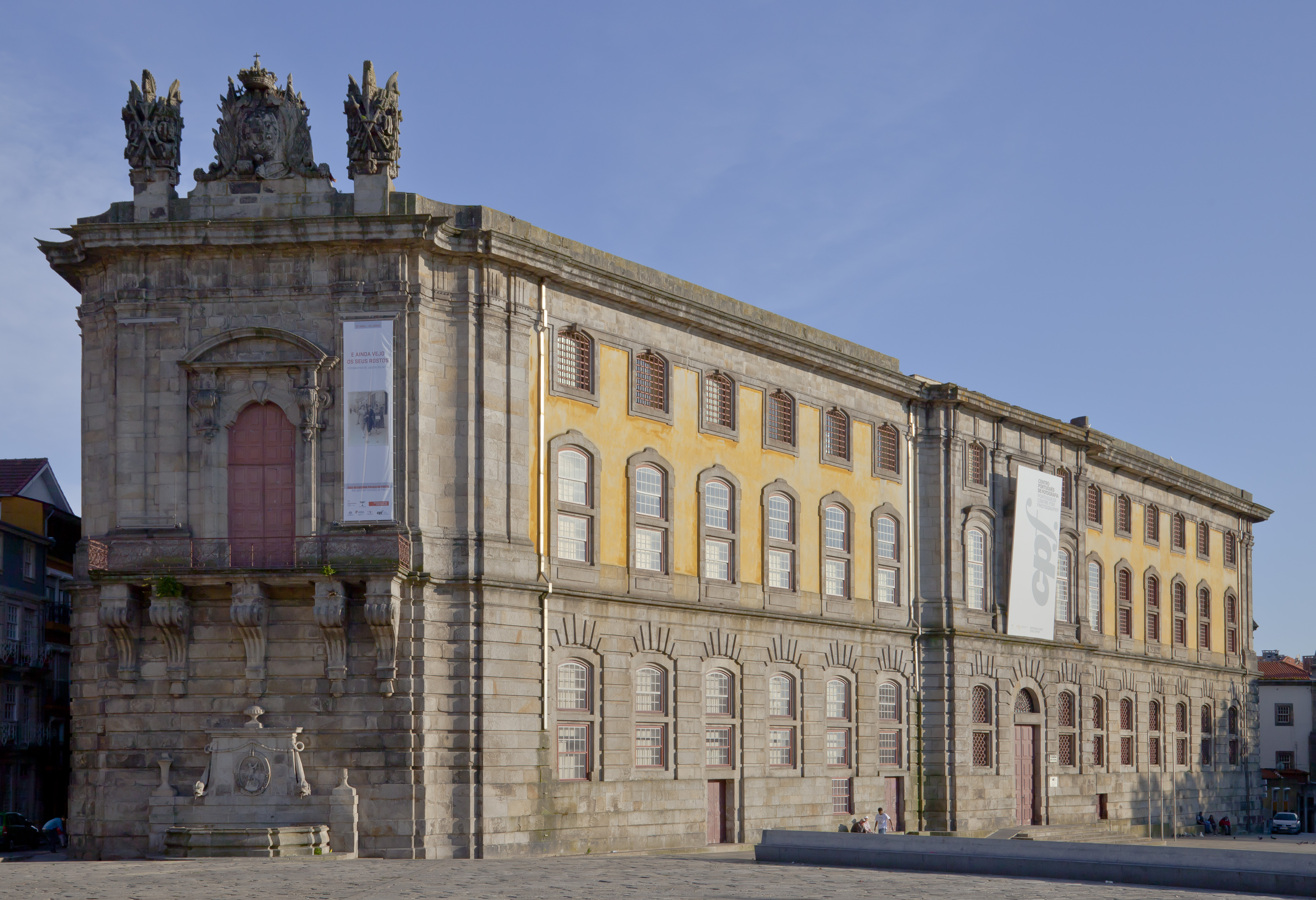
Building of the Portuguese Centre of Photography

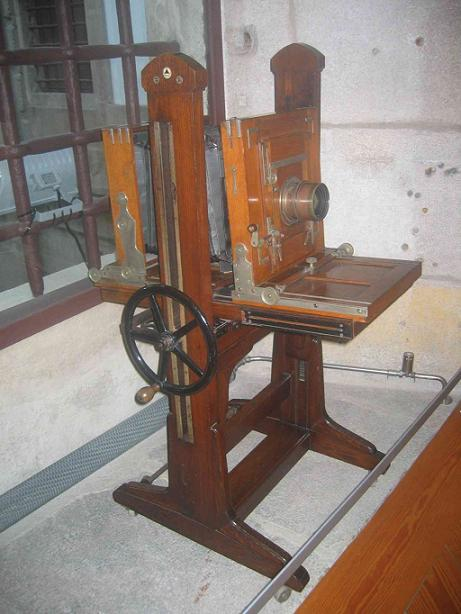
Item in exhibition at the Centre

The Portuguese Centre of Photography was founded in 1997. The first exhibitions began in December of the same year on the ground floor of the building until 2000. The building was temporarily closed for renovation and reopened in 2001.

== History ==
Following the advice of the working group established by Minister Manuel Maria Carrilho, in 1996, the then Ministry of Culture created the Portuguese Center of Photography. Photographic culture had begun to be revived by the appearance of photography schools, festivals and galleries attracting photographers who were exiled during the Salazar regime, publishing internationally relevant work.

The building would only be occupied entirely by the CPF in 2001, after restoring and adaptation by the team of architects Eduardo Souto Moura and Humberto Vieira. The building was the former Cadeia da Relação (cadeia in Portuguese is jail or prison and Relação refers to the Tribunal de Relação, a former Portuguese court of second instance).
