= Ribeira Square =

Historical square in Porto, Portugal

Coordinates: 41.1407°N 8.6130°W

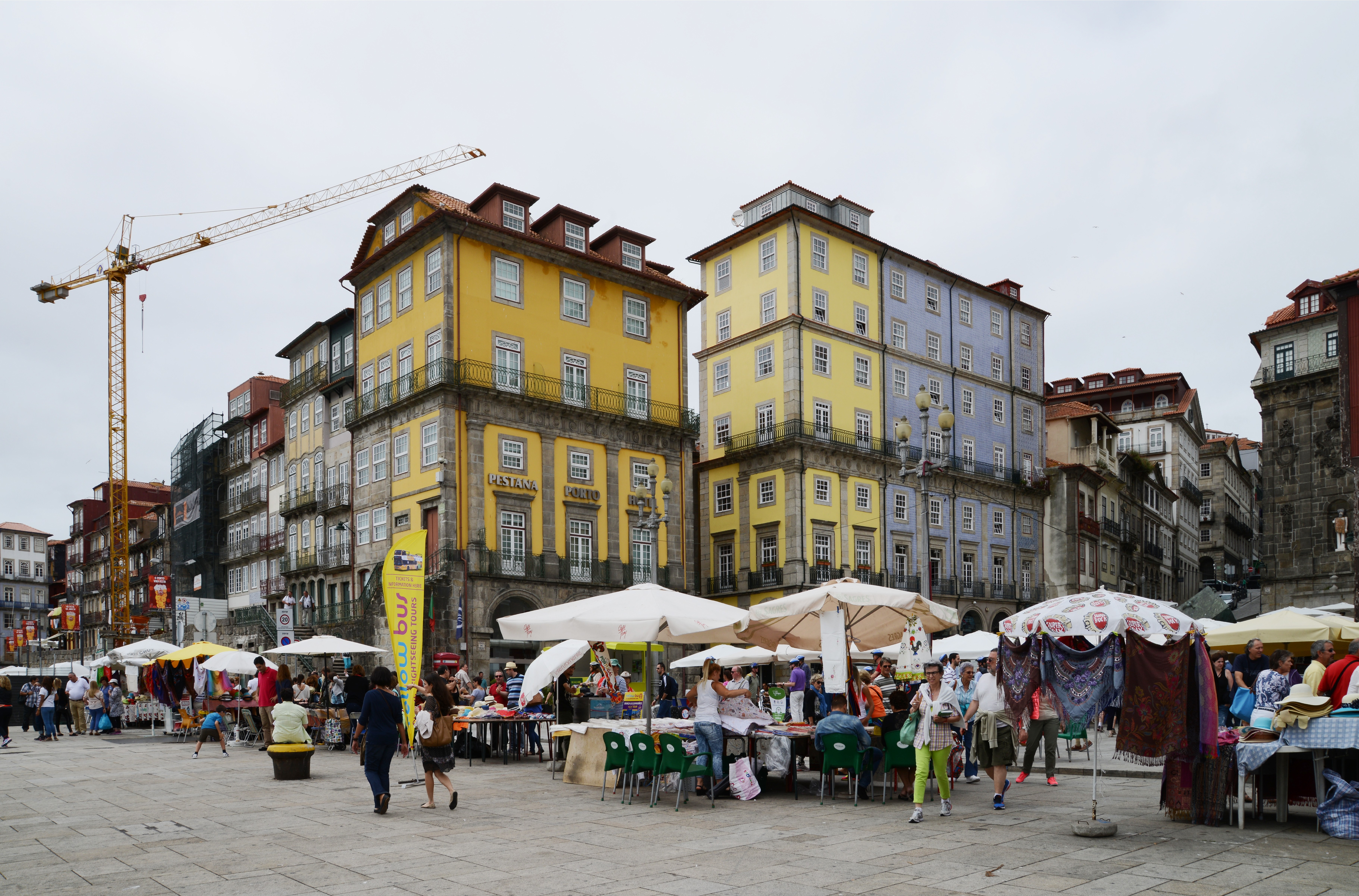
Ribeira Square.

The Ribeira Square (Portuguese: Praça da Ribeira) is a historical square in Porto, Portugal. It is included in the historical centre of the city, designated World Heritage by UNESCO.

== History ==
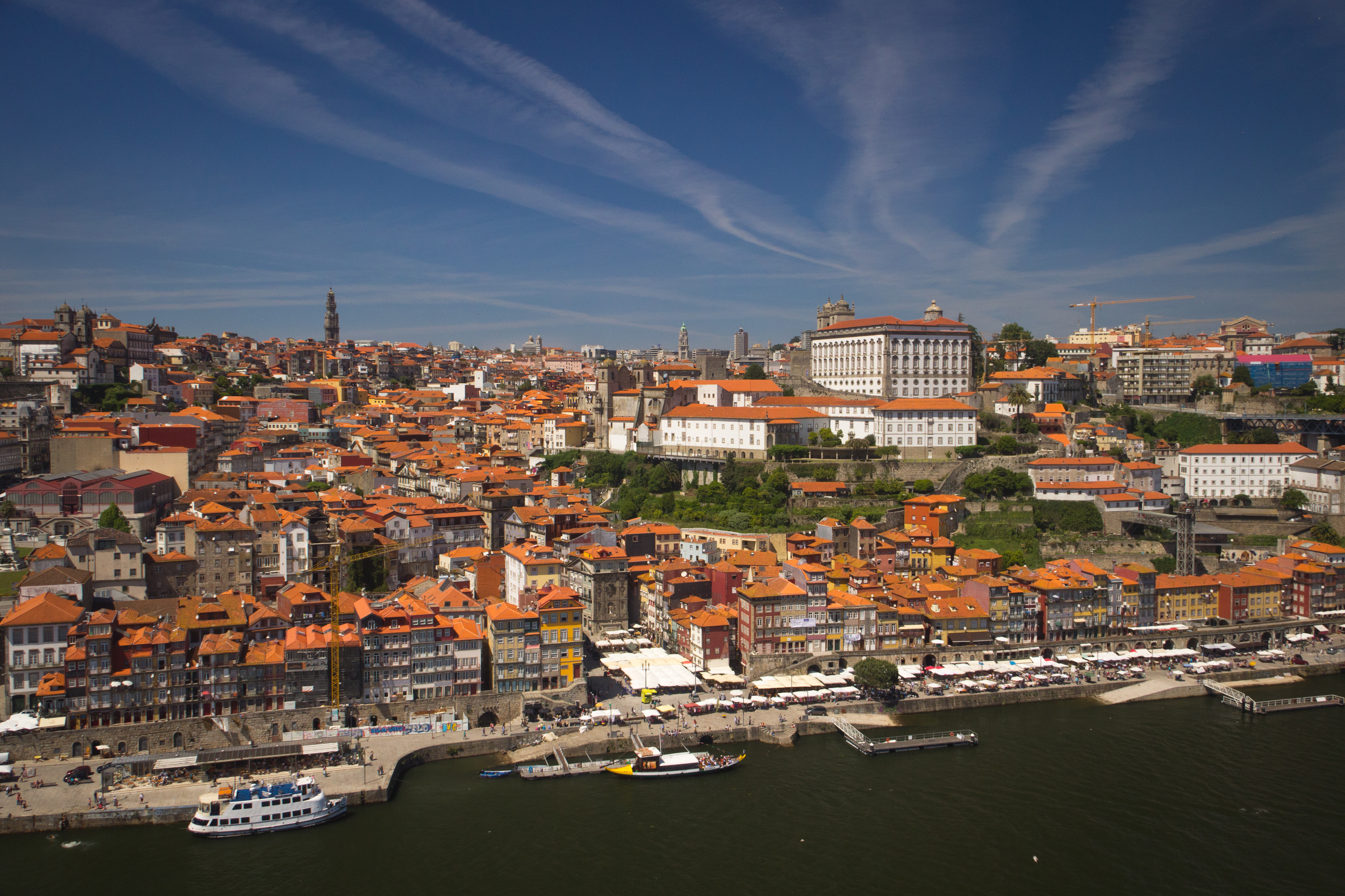
Aerial view of Ribeira Square and the surrounding district

The square is located in the historical district of Ribeira (riverside in Portuguese), part of the São Nicolau parish. The Ribeira district spreads alongside the Douro river and used to be a centre of intense commercial and manufacturing activity since the Middle Ages. Also since that time the Ribeira Square was the site of many shops that sold fish, bread, meat and other goods. In 1491 the buildings around the square were destroyed in a fire, and the houses were rebuilt with arcades in their groundfloors. During this rebuilding campaign the square also gained a pavement made of stone slabs.

In the mid-18th century the city needed new urban improvements to provide for the swift flow of goods and people between the Ribeira neighbourhood and other areas of Porto. In this context, governor João de Almada e Melo opened a new street, the São João Street, that connected the Ribeira Square and the upper town, and promoted the reurbanisation of the square itself. The project, executed between 1776 and 1782, is credited to John Whitehead, English consul in Porto. The square was to become enclosed on its north, west and east sides by buildings with arcades, while the south side of the square, facing the Douro, was enclosed by the medieval walls (Muralhas Fernandinas) of Porto. These walls were torn down in 1821, opening the square to the river.

The Ribeira Square and its surrounding has been classified as Property of Public Interest since 1971.

== Points of interest ==
The northern part of the square has a monumental fountain, three storeys high, built in the 1780s and decorated with the coat-of-arms of Portugal. The niche of the fountain is occupied by a modern statue of St John the Baptist by sculptor João Cutileiro. The square also has a modern cubic sculpture by José Rodrigues (nicknamed the Cubo da Ribeira) over the remains of a 17th-century fountain.

Nowadays the Ribeira Square is a favourite spot for tourists.

== See also ==
- Douro
- Liberdade Square
- Tourist attractions in Porto
