= Fernandine Walls of Porto =

Well preserved walls in Porto, Portugal

Fernandine Walls
- Muralhas Fernandinas
- Porto, Grande Porto, Norte in Portugal
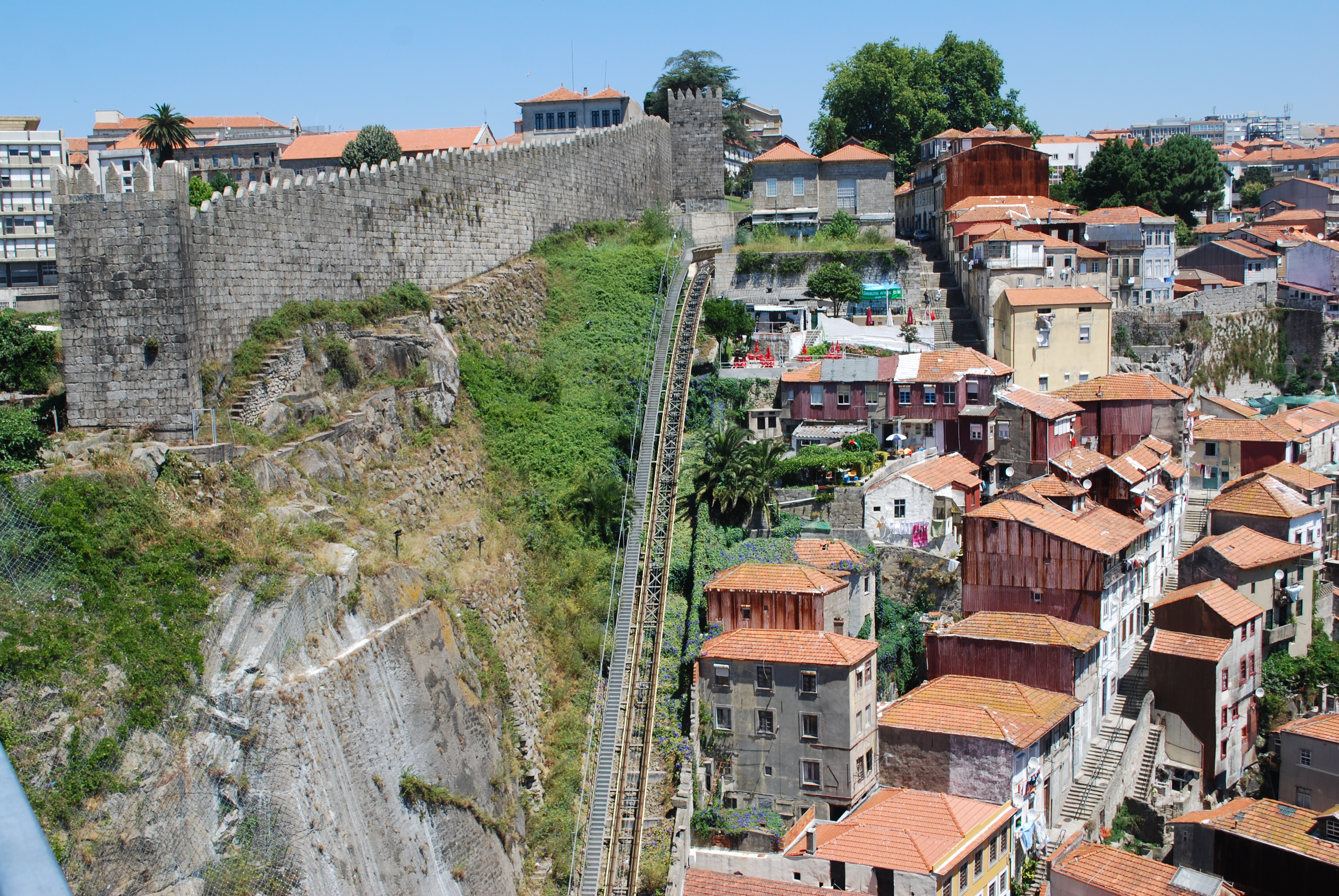
- A view of the obvious part of the Fernandina Walls in Guindais

Site information
- Type: Fort
- Owner: Portuguese Republic
- Open to the public: Public

Location
- Location of the walled fortifications within the municipality of Porto

Site history
- Materials: Stone, Granite, Iron, Wood

The Walls of Dom Fernando (Portuguese: Muralhas de D. Fernando), or Fernandine Walls (Portuguese: Muralhas Fernandinas), are medieval fortifications located in the civil parish of Cedofeita, Santo Ildefonso, Sé, Miragaia, São Nicolau e Vitória, in the municipality of Porto, Portuguese Porto.

== History ==
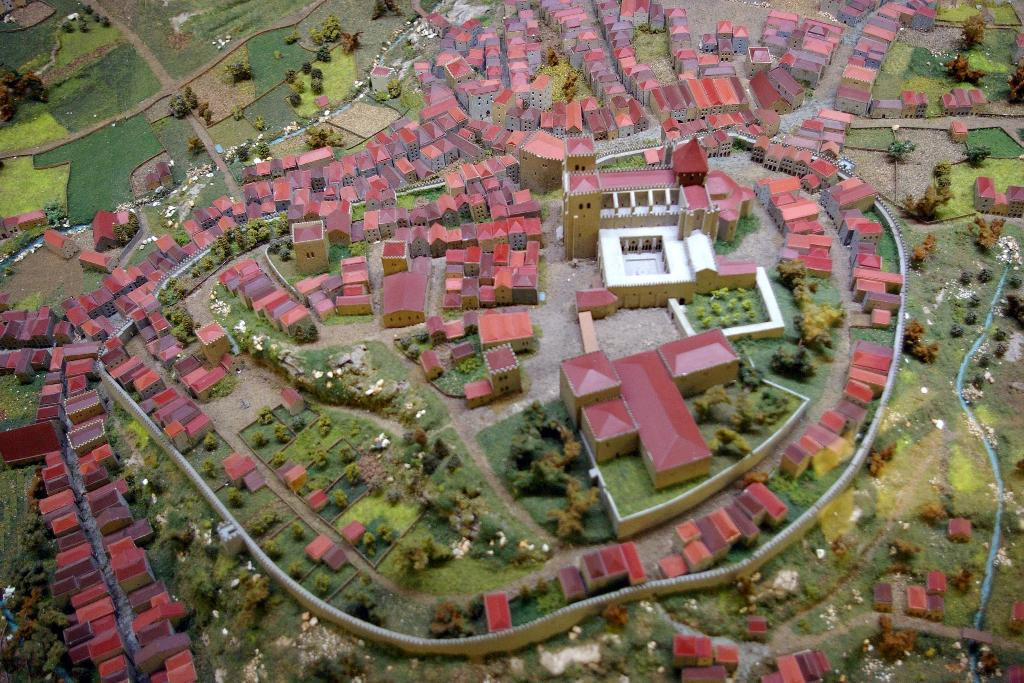
A maquette of the medieval town of Porto, with its earlier, "Suevan"/Sé walls - the Fernandina Walls covered a significantly larger area and reached the riverfront

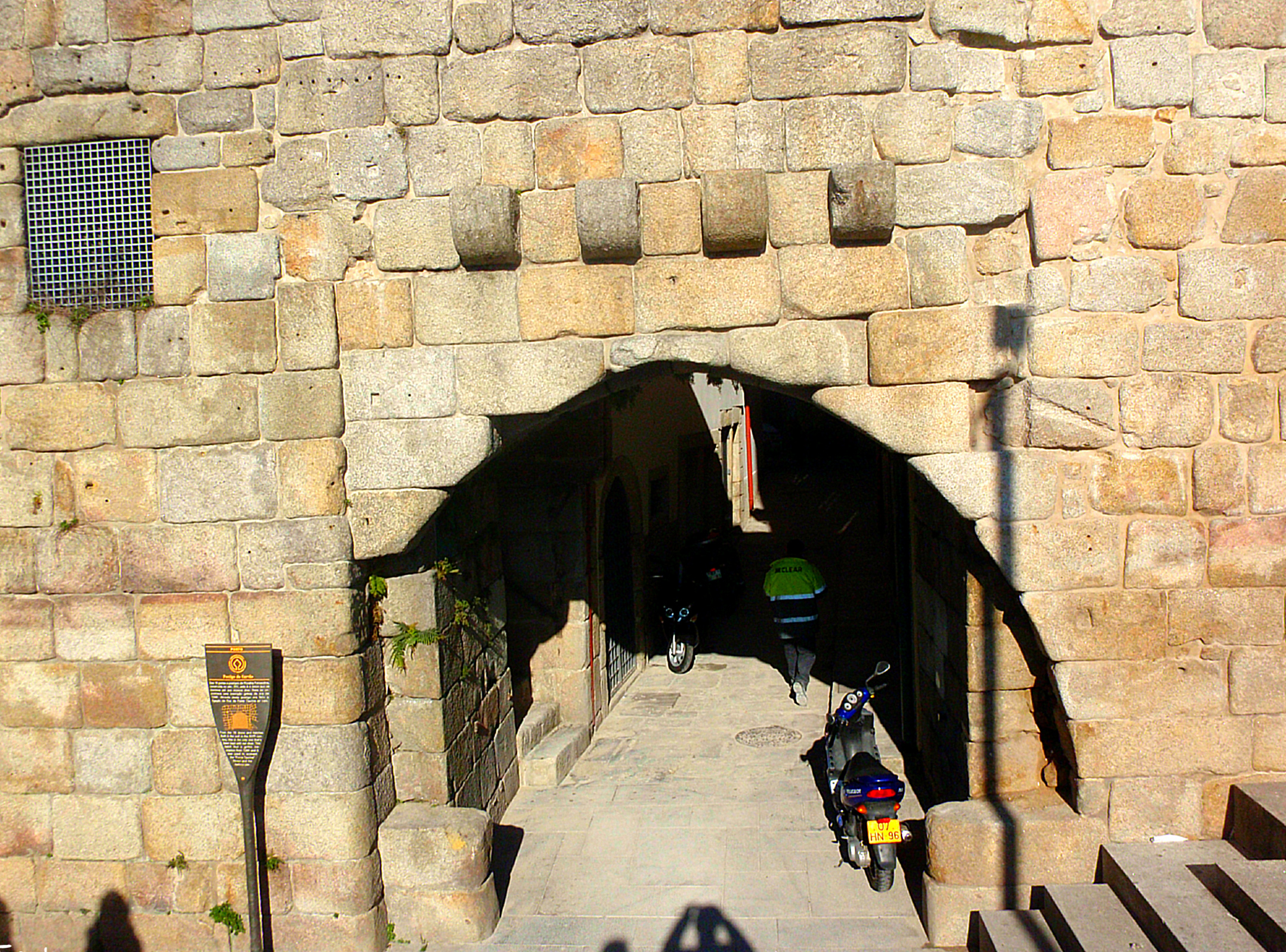
The gate Postigo do Carvão dating to 1348

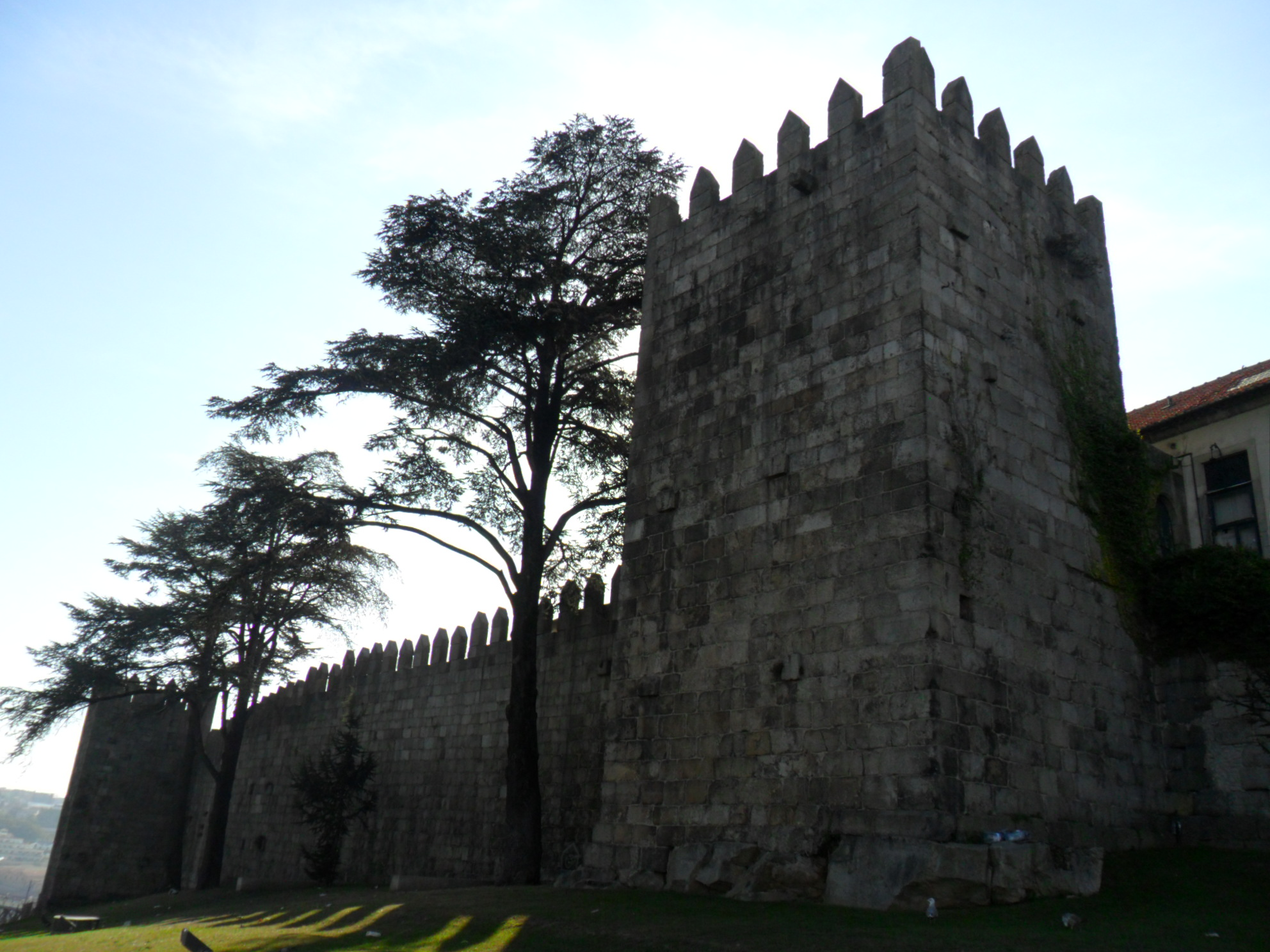
The rectangular watchtowers and visible fortifications

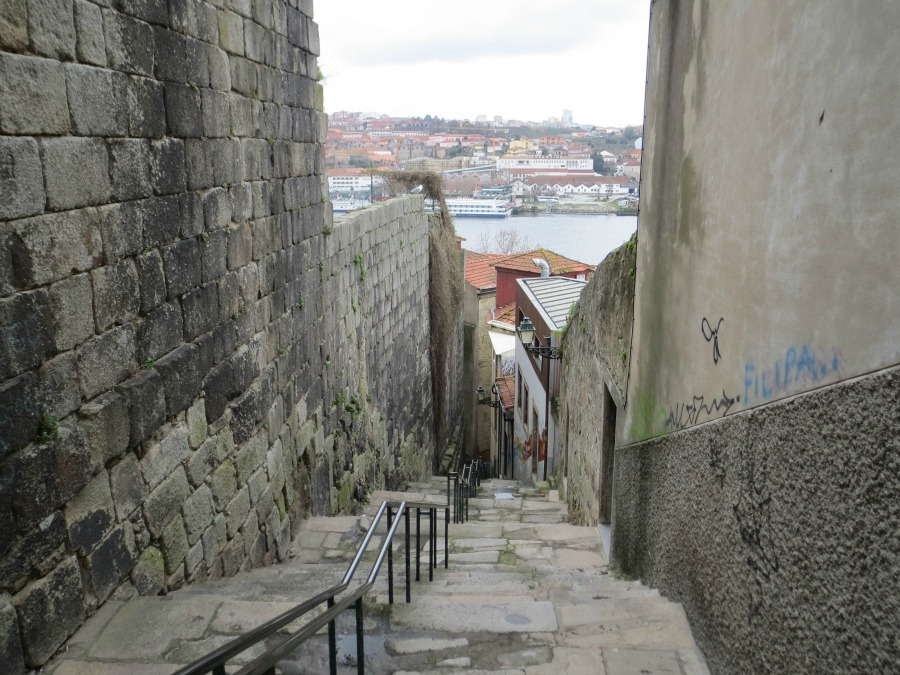
A staircase alongside segment of the fortifications

Construction of a series of walls began in 1336 in the reign of D. Afonso IV and were completed during the reign of D. Fernando in 1376. The first walls were built on the foundations of a small "circus" that encircled an area of smaller dimensions, reflecting the great development of the town. The basis of these new walls were marked by an inscription dating 1348 over the gate of Postigo do Carvão. This Romanesque wall was constructed in the 12th century, demarcating the administrative and urbanistic extent of Porto, after a long period of dispersed population. Of this structure, there are important remains that were not destroyed in the intervening years. Encircling the Sé's wall (the centre of the medieval town) is an irregular oval, cut by four principal gates, among them the Gate of Vandoma (that was demolished by the municipal council in 1885). The enlargement over the next 200 years beyond the Romanesque walls to the ones constructed in the 14th century was due to the town's population growth to about 10000 inhabitants. The city developed in all directions, but primarily towards the west and north, linked by the elevated bridges of Vitória and Batalha; its growth is easily recognizable in the urban relief. The main line is located in the east, easily visible from the bridge Ponte D. Luís, and comprises a section of walls with road, protected by two rectangular towers.

"The location of the gates of the new wall leaves it very clear the outline of the historical roads that linked the Burgo do Bispo neighborhood to São João da Foz and Bouças, Braga, Guimarães and Penafiel. In the interwall roadway was the square of São Domingos, part of that fundamental circulation in the pattern of internal urban links."

In the following centuries, there were many alterations. The majority of these changes affected the gates and lines of communication with the exterior.

In 1409, the Postigo dos Carros gate was constructed, followed in 1521 by the construction of the Porta Nova dos Carros. This new gate eventually replaced the Postigo da Praia in 1522.

By 1529, it was necessary to urgently repair the line of walls between the Porta de Santo Elói and Porta do Olival; records from that time suggest that 360 "arms-lengths" were in a state of ruin.

In 1580, a small round fort was constructed on the angle alongside the Porta Nova or Porta Nobre.

By 1764, the first repurposing the walls began with the Postigo de Santo Elói transformed into a gate, followed in 1768 by the Postigo do Penedo and the Porta do Sol reused and reconstructed, with 45 "arms-lengths" of wall along the Monastery of Santa Clara. Various gates began to be demolished during this period; in 1774, the Porta da Ribeira was demolished; between 1789 and 1794, the Porta do Olival was destroyed; in 1792, the Porta de Nossa Senhora da Batalha was also taken down; and by 1821, removal of the line of walls that closed the access to the Praça da Ribera along the river.

In the first half of the 19th century, the walls parallel to the river in front of the urban area of Barredo, were transformed through the opening of a series of arcades separated by small oculi.

By 1827, the Porta dos Carros was also demolished, followed in subsequent years by the Postigo do Peixe (or Postigo da Alfândega Velha); the wall and west of the Gate of Olival, between 1853 and 1854; the Porta Nobre in 1872, in order to open the Rua Nova da Alfândega; and the demolition of the Porta do Sol in 1875. By 1888, there still remained corbels along the Porta dos Carros.

In the 20th century, the medieval walls were reconstructed during a revivalist campaign of restoration that was characteristic of the Estado Novo. This work occurred between 1959 and 1962, with priority along the cliff of Guindais. During this work, a Gothic house-tower was discovered along Rua de D. Pedro Pitões, alongside the Sé Cathedral. Restored by Rogério de Azevedo, it became the ex-libris of the medieval military structures of the city, initially sheltering the Gabinete de História da Cidade (city historical cabinet). More recently, a few archaeological interventions contributed decisively to a better understanding of the Portuense military evolution.

== Architecture ==
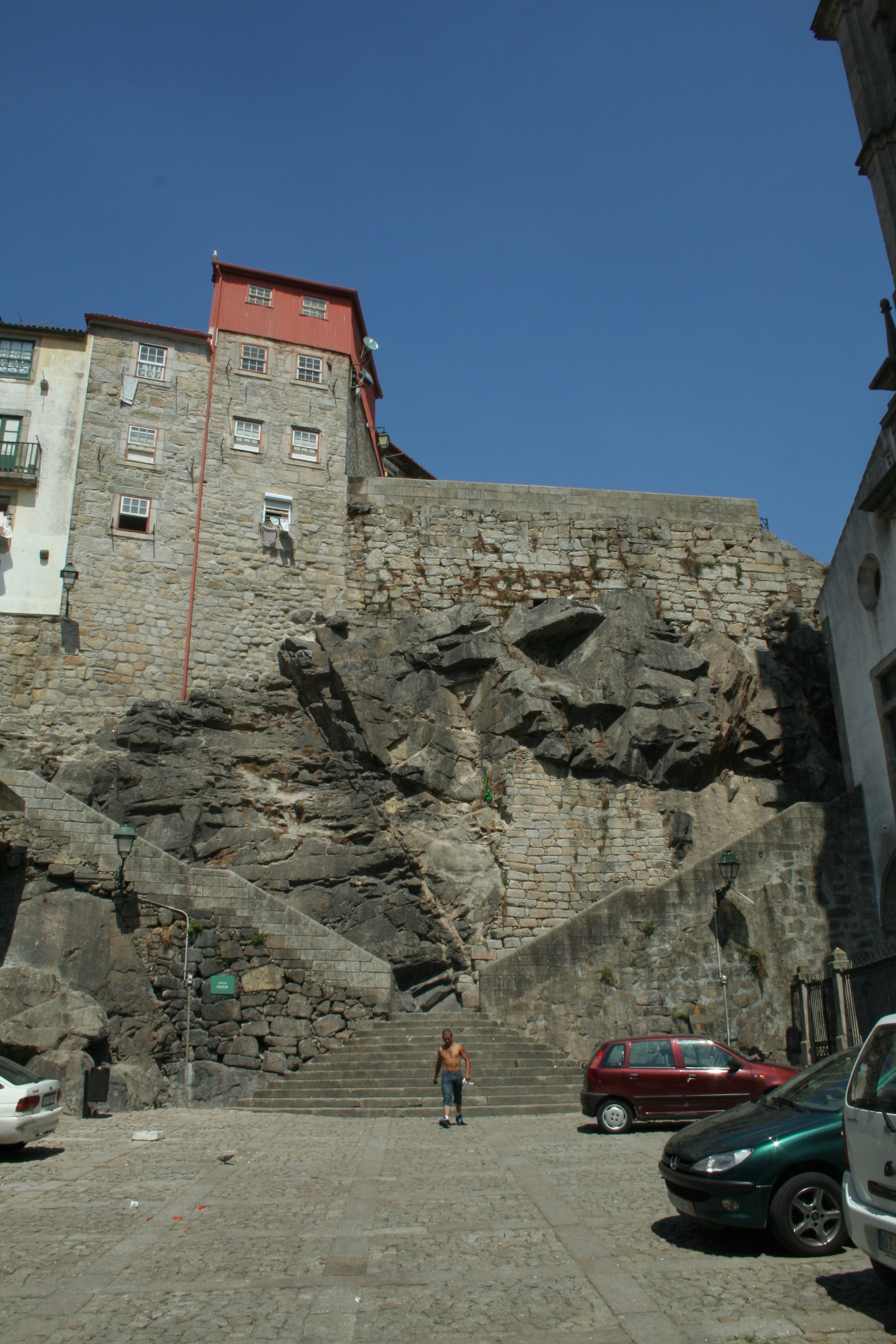
A view of the ancient walls and staircase of Morro da Sé

Many of the structures, including walls and towers, are integrated into the buildings of the old town, with the main wall being the Guindais wall and tower, relatively isolated over the margin of the river.

The best remaining example of the Fernandine wall fortifications is preserved in the cliffs of Guindais, above the river, through to the monastery of Santa Clara, following the Postigo do Carvalho, to the Postigo de Santo António do Penedo and later the gate of Porta do Sol. The lines continued through the local community to the Governo Civil and the Teatro de S. João, passing along the Rua de Cimo de Vila, where a gate with the same name existed. The fortifications then extended east to west at this point, crossed the Calçada de Sta. Teresa and the Viela da Madeira where some covered remains, until Postigo (later Porta) dos Carros. The walls continued to the extinct Convent of Lóios, today the actual building of the Cardosas, where the Porta de Santo Elói was located. From there the fortifications followed to the Calçada dos Clérigos and Rua da Assunção until the Cordoaria (in the Campo Mártires da Pátria), where the Porta do Olival, the principal entryway to Braga and Viana do Castelo was located. Of this last line and gate some of the remains are integrated into constructions. The walls then descended to the river, where some remains were conserved behind the homes that fronted the Rua das Taipas and Rua de Dr. Barbosa de Castro. Alongside the Largo das Virtudes existed a gate also, of the same name. It then continued in the direction of the river, behind the Palace of São João Novo, where the gate of Porta de Nossa Senhora da Esperança. Here also, there were preserved walls, like along the Escadas do Caminho Novo that terminated at the river. Before the walls inflected to parallel the river east to west, existed the Postigo da Praia, later transformed into the Porta da Praia, Porta Nova or Porta Nobre, and preserved into the Soares dos Reis Museum. On the lines paralleling the river, there were a number of towers: Postigo dos Banhos, Postigos do Pereira (or Lingueta), Postigo da Alfândega, Postigo do Carvão (the only one still preserved), the Postigo do Peixe, the Porta da Ribeira, and later four towers, the Postigo do Pelourinho, the Postigo da Forca, the Postigo da Madeira and the Postigo da Areia (alongside the escarpment of the Guindais) where it rose toward the north. The walls are considerably modified, through a number of passages cut or carved into the walls; many walls are conserved, especially along the river, being knowing as the Muro da Ribeira or Muro dos Bacalhoeiros.
