= Church of São Francisco (Porto) =

Church in Porto, Portugal

- Location within Portugal

Religion
- Affiliation: Roman Catholic

Location
- Location: Porto, Portugal
- Coordinates: 41.141016°N 8.61574°W

Architecture
- Type: Gothic
- Completed: 15th-century

The Church of Saint Francis (Portuguese: Igreja de São Francisco) is the most prominent Gothic monument in Porto, Portugal, being also noted for its outstanding Baroque inner decoration. It is located in the historic centre of the city, declared World Heritage Site by UNESCO.

== History ==
The Franciscan Order was established in Porto around 1223. Initially, the order was antagonised by the secular and clergy of other religious institutions, particularly by the bishop of Porto. It took a papal bull, the Bulla Doelentis accepimus by Pope Innocent V, to restore to the Franciscans the plot of land previously donated to them. They began building the convent and a first, small church dedicated to Saint Francis of Assisi around 1244.

In 1383, under the patronage of King Ferdinand I, the Franciscans began to build a more spacious church. This new structure was finished around 1425 and followed a relatively plain Gothic design, typical for the mendicant orders in Portugal. The general structure of the church has not been extensively altered, making São Francisco the best example of Gothic architecture in Porto.

During the 15th and 16th centuries, prominent Porto families chose the Franciscan for their pantheon. The Chapel of St John the Baptist is a notable example, built in the 1530s for the Carneiro family in Manueline style, the Portuguese late Gothic. The main artistic campaign of the church was carried out in the first half of the 18th century, when most of the surfaces of the interior of the church, including walls, pillars, side chapels and roof, were covered with Portuguese gilt wood work (talha dourada) in Baroque style. Particularly notable are the many Baroque altarpieces of the apse chapels and the nave, which are among the best in Portugal.

A fire, caused by the siege of Porto in 1832, destroyed the old cloisters. In its place, the Commercial Association of the city built the Stock Exchange Palace (Palácio da Bolsa), a magnificent example of 19th century Neoclassical architecture.

== Art ==
=== Exterior and floorplan ===
The main façade of the Franciscan church has a large, elaborate rose window in Gothic style. This is the only original decoration of the main façade. The West portal is now a typical Baroque work, organised in two tiers, with solomonic columns and a statue of St Francis.

The South portal, facing the river, is still Gothic. The portal is stepped forward from the facade and has a triangular gable decorated with a pentagram. The opening is composed of a series of Gothic archivolts; the inner moulding is decorated with an arcade relief of Mudéjar (Islamic influenced) design.

The church has a nave with three aisles, with the central aisle being the highest. The East end of the church has a transept and an apse with three chapels. The crossing area is illuminated by the large windows of the transept arms and main chapel, as well as by a small rose window over the main chapel with tracery in the shape of a pentagram.

=== Interior ===
A polychrome granite statue (13th century) of Saint Francis of Assisi, standing inside the church next to the entrance within a Baroque altarpiece, is a remnant of the first St Francis church, replaced after 1383 by the present structure.

During the 15th and 16th centuries several noble families chose St Francis as their pantheon. Near the entrance is located the old pantheon for the family of Luís Álvares de Sousa, with an interesting Gothic portal decorated with a coat-of-arms and a dedicatory inscription. The chapel is nowadays occupied by a Baroque altarpiece.

Another interesting chapel is the one dedicated to Saint John the Baptist (São João Baptista), built around 1534 in the right transept arm for the family of João Carneiro. This chapel, by architect Diogo de Castilho, has a beautiful portal and is covered with an intricate rib vaulting in Manueline style. The Baroque altarpiece of the chapel still has the 16th-century painting, representing the Baptism of Christ, incorporated into a Baroque altarpiece. From the same period, the church also has a fine Renaissance tomb, imbedded onto a wall.

In the early 18th century the lateral aisles and apse chapels were extensively decorated with exuberant gilt wood work (talha dourada) by several Portuguese wood carvers. This decorative richness is the most notable feature of the Franciscan church, covering almost completely the roofs of the aisles, pillars, window frames and chapels and hiding the underlying mediaeval architecture. Even though the Baroque gilt work does not completely harmonise with the Gothic structure of the church, it is considered one of the most outstanding of Portugal.

Among the altarpieces, particularly important is the one that depicts the "Tree of Jesse" on the North lateral aisle. This polychromed woodwork was carved by Filipe da Silva and António Gomes, as stated in a contract of 1718. It represents a family tree of Jesus with twelve kings of Judah connected through branches of the tree to the recumbent body of Jesse. On the top of the tree is Joseph, under an image of the Virgin and the Child. The niches flanking this tree contain statues of St. Anne and St. Joachim (father and mother of Maria) and four Franciscan doctors who wrote about the Immaculate Conception.

Another notable example of gilt wood decoration in Porto is the interior of the Santa Clara Church.

The facade of the church is flanked by interesting monuments like the 18th century, Neoclassical Church of the Ordem Terceira de São Francisco and the Dispatch House of the Order (Casa de Despachos), which houses a museum and has an interesting Baroque interior.

== Gallery ==
The São Francisco complex seen from across the Douro

Courtyard and façades of the São Francisco complex

Nave looking toward the chancel

Nave looking toward the rose window

Chancel

Tree of Jesse altarpiece

Nave of the Third Order church

Meeting room of the Casa do Despacho
