= Igreja de Santa Clara (Porto) =

Church in Porto, Portugal

Coordinates: 41°08′33″N 8°36′33″W

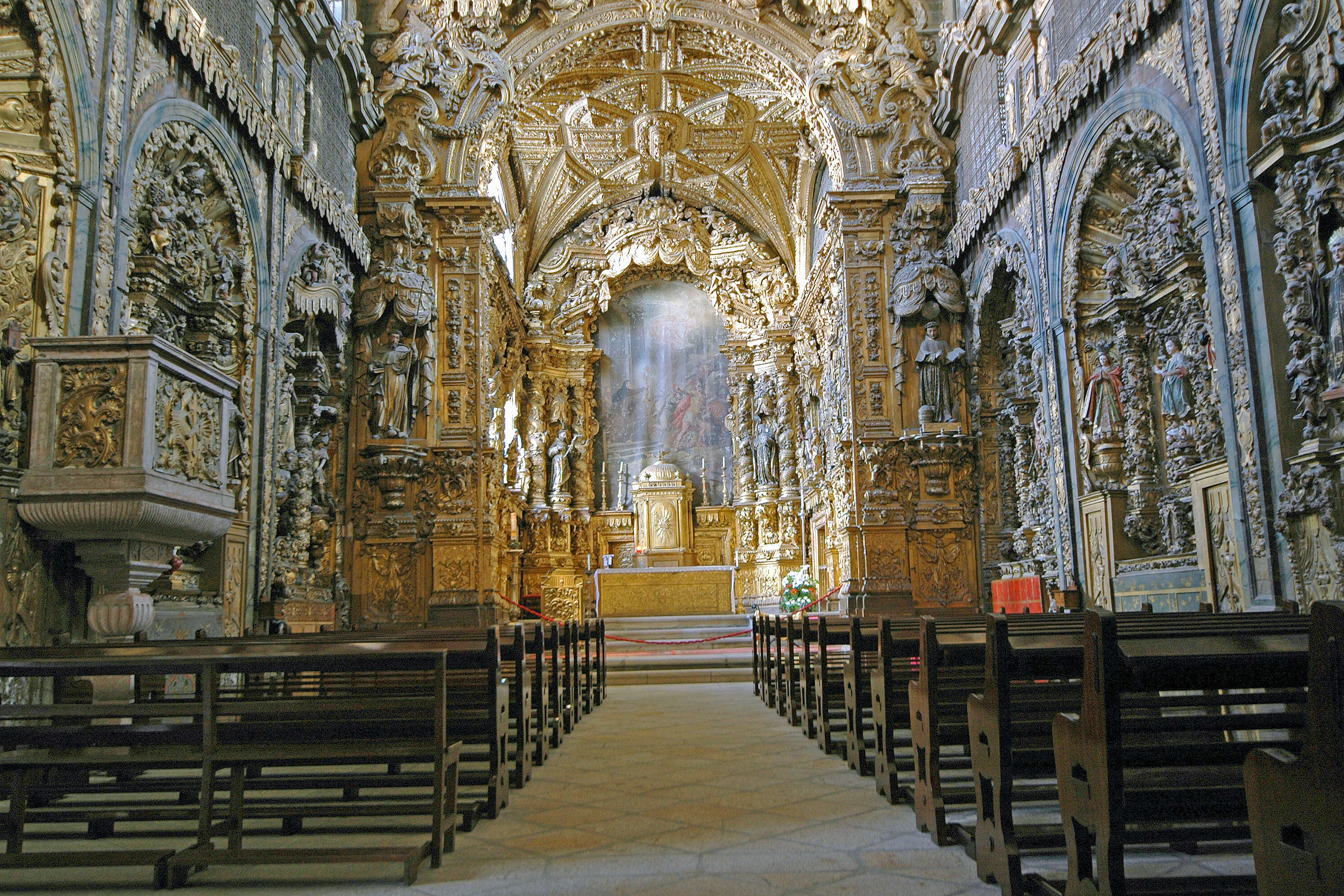

Igreja de Santa Clara is a Catholic church located in the parish of Sé in Porto, Portugal.

The construction of the church began in 1416 alongside the Santa Clara Convent for use by nuns of the Order of Poor Clares. The nuns settled in the church in 1427, which was eventually completed in 1457. The building has been modified several times since then; for instance, in 1707–1715 new bedrooms were constructed, in 1729 the chapel was expanded, and in 1931 the fountain in the yard was demolished. The interior of the church is covered in gold and polychrome. Since 1910, it has been classified as a National Monument. It is also classified as a World Heritage Site by UNESCO as of 1996.

== Gallery ==
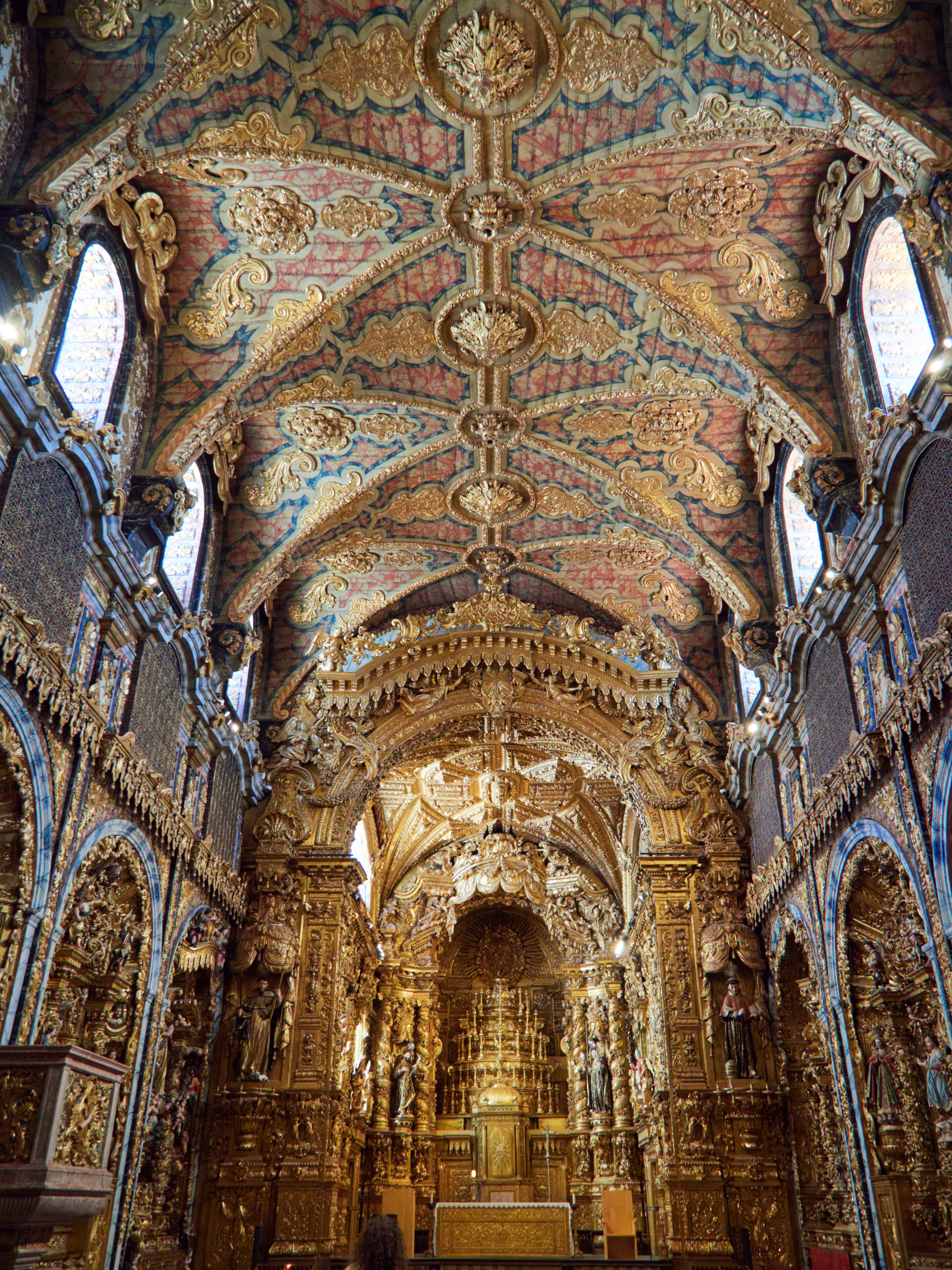

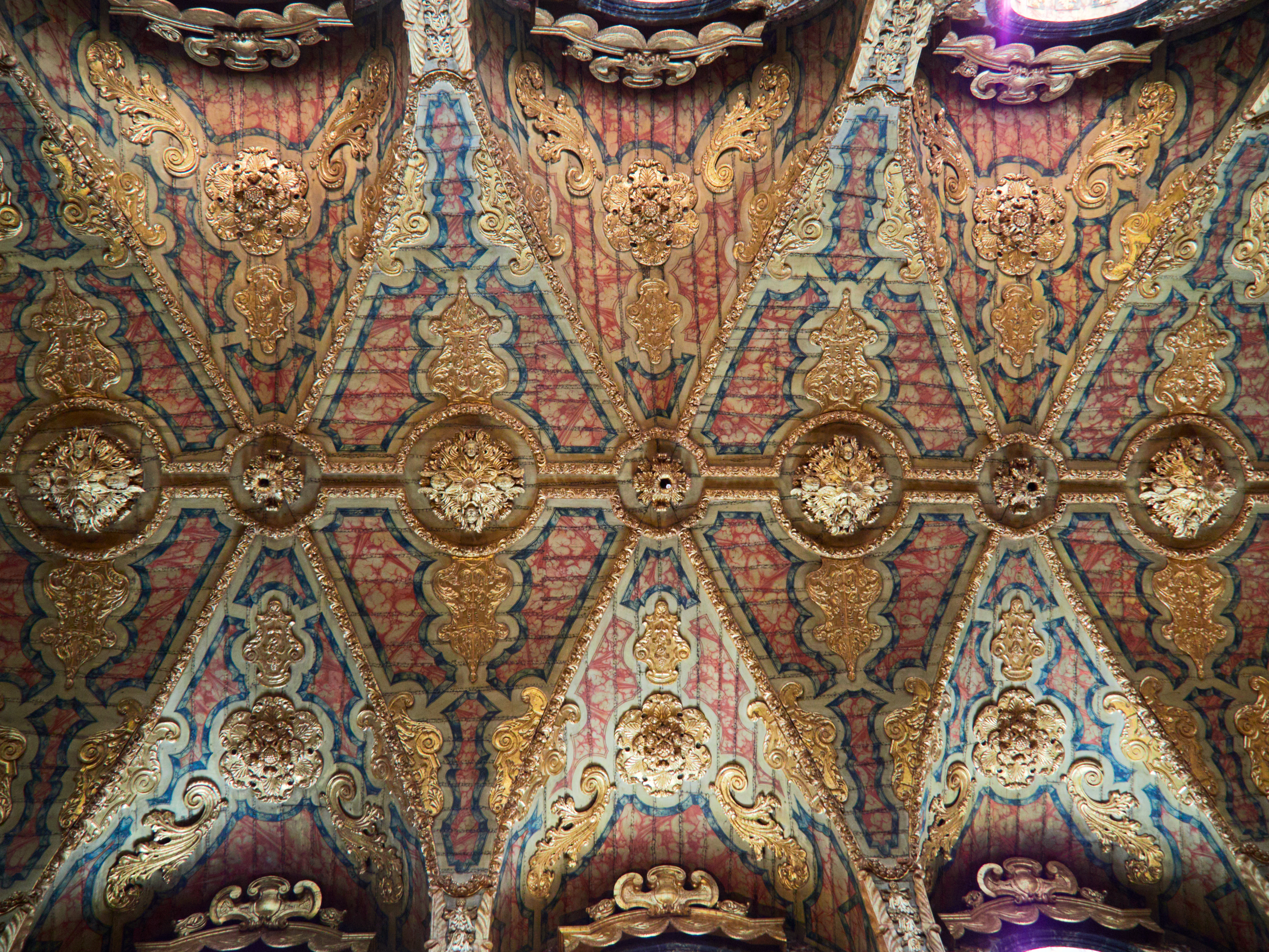

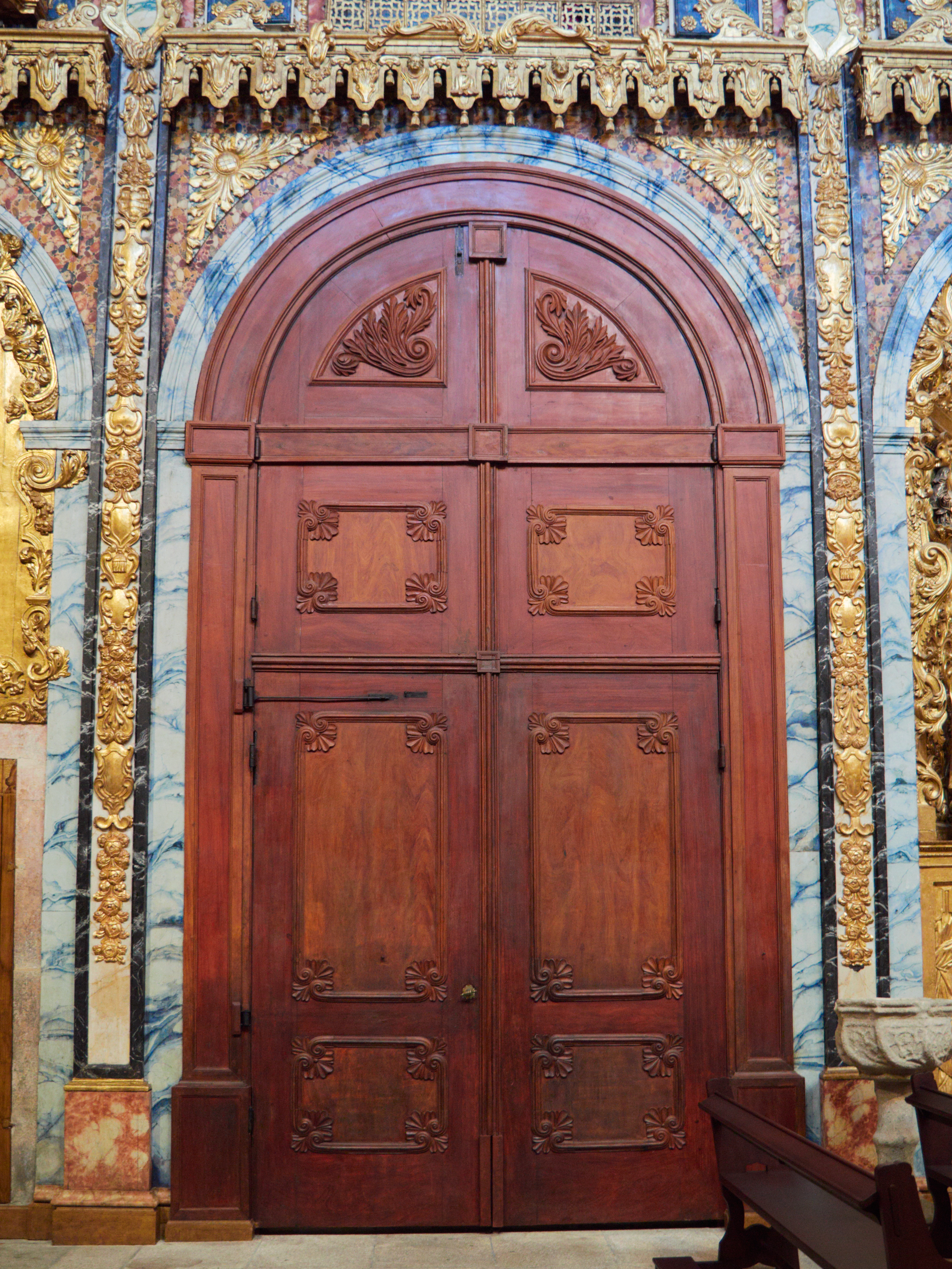

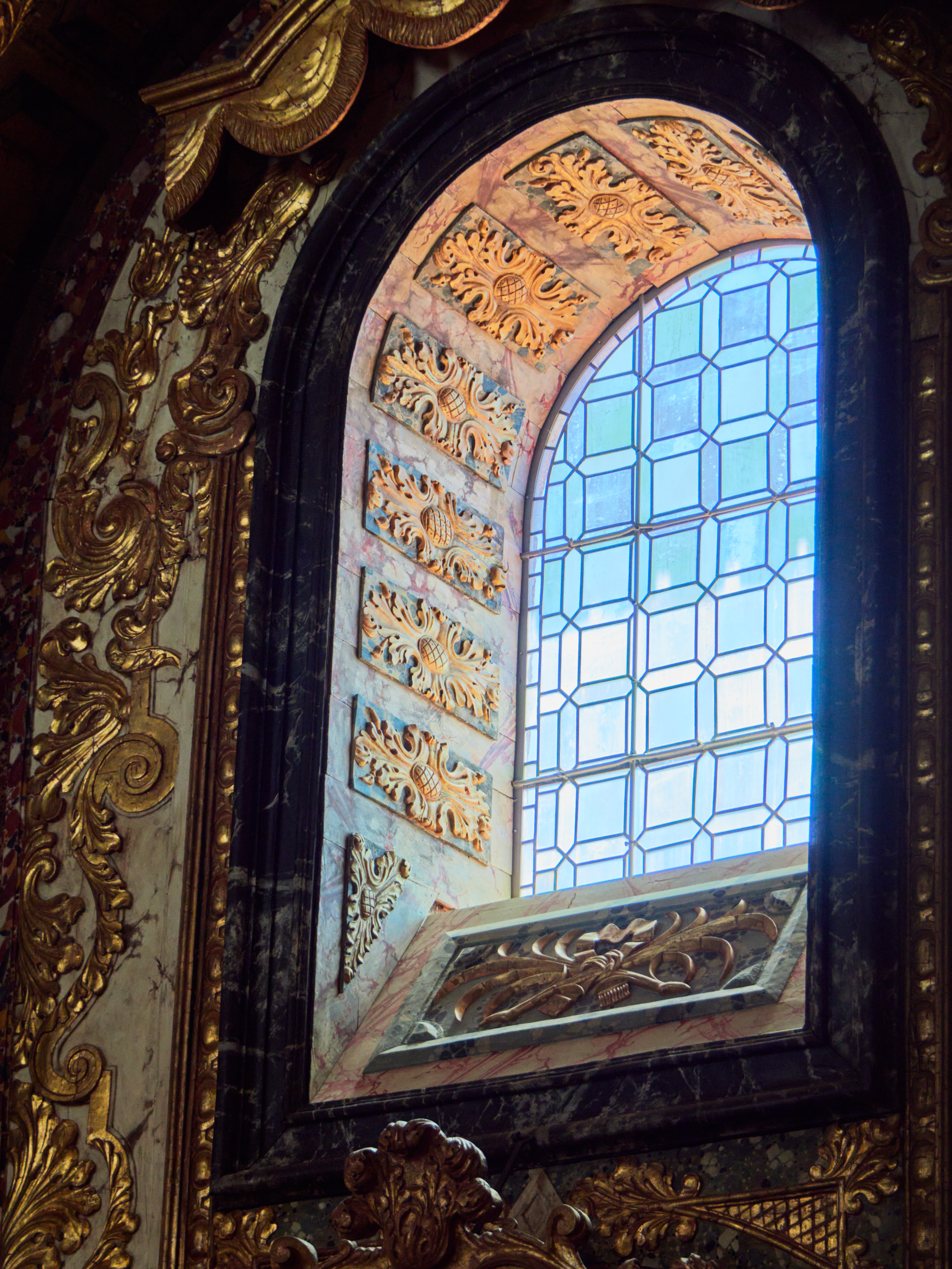

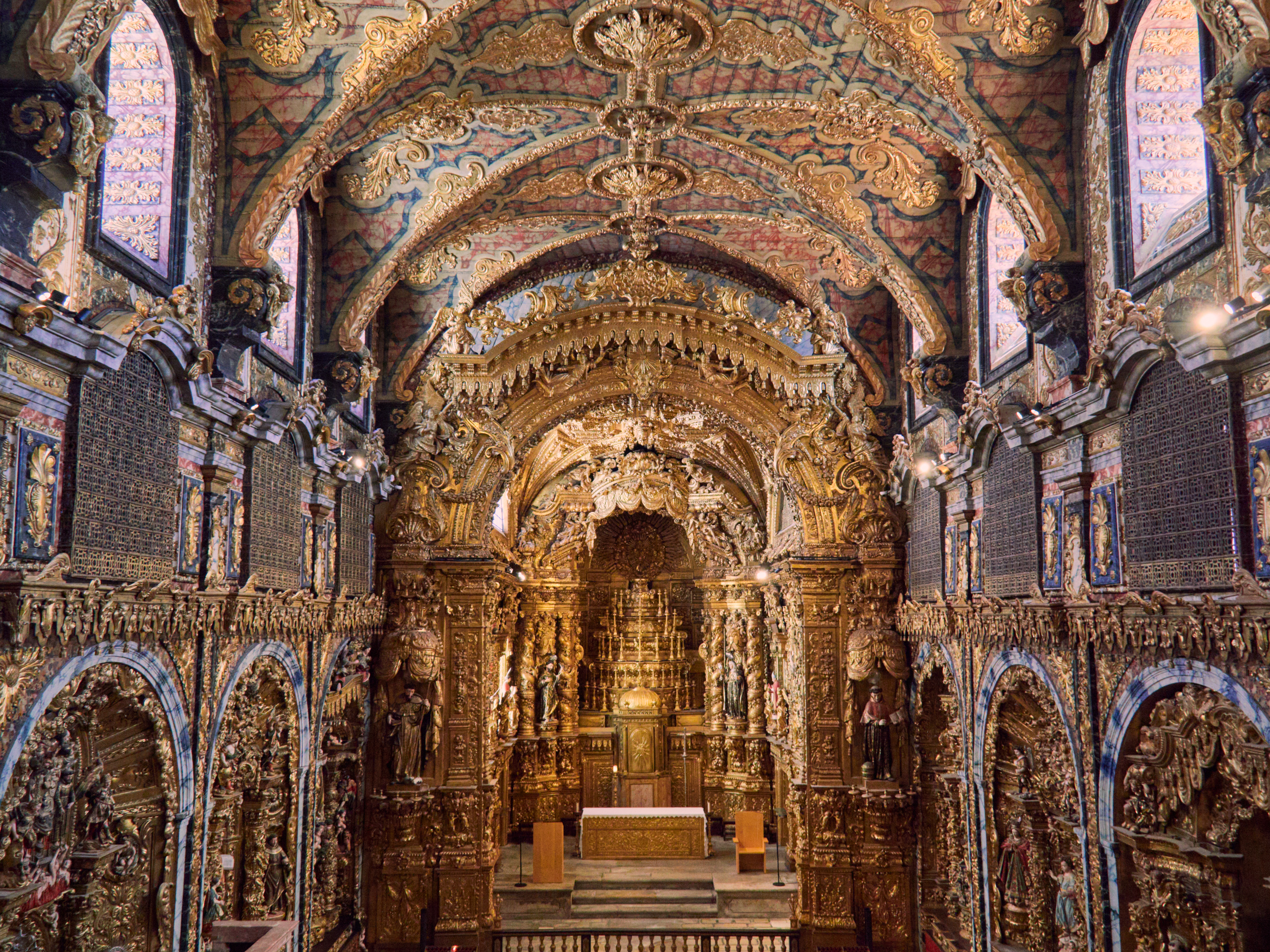
