= Sea Life Porto =

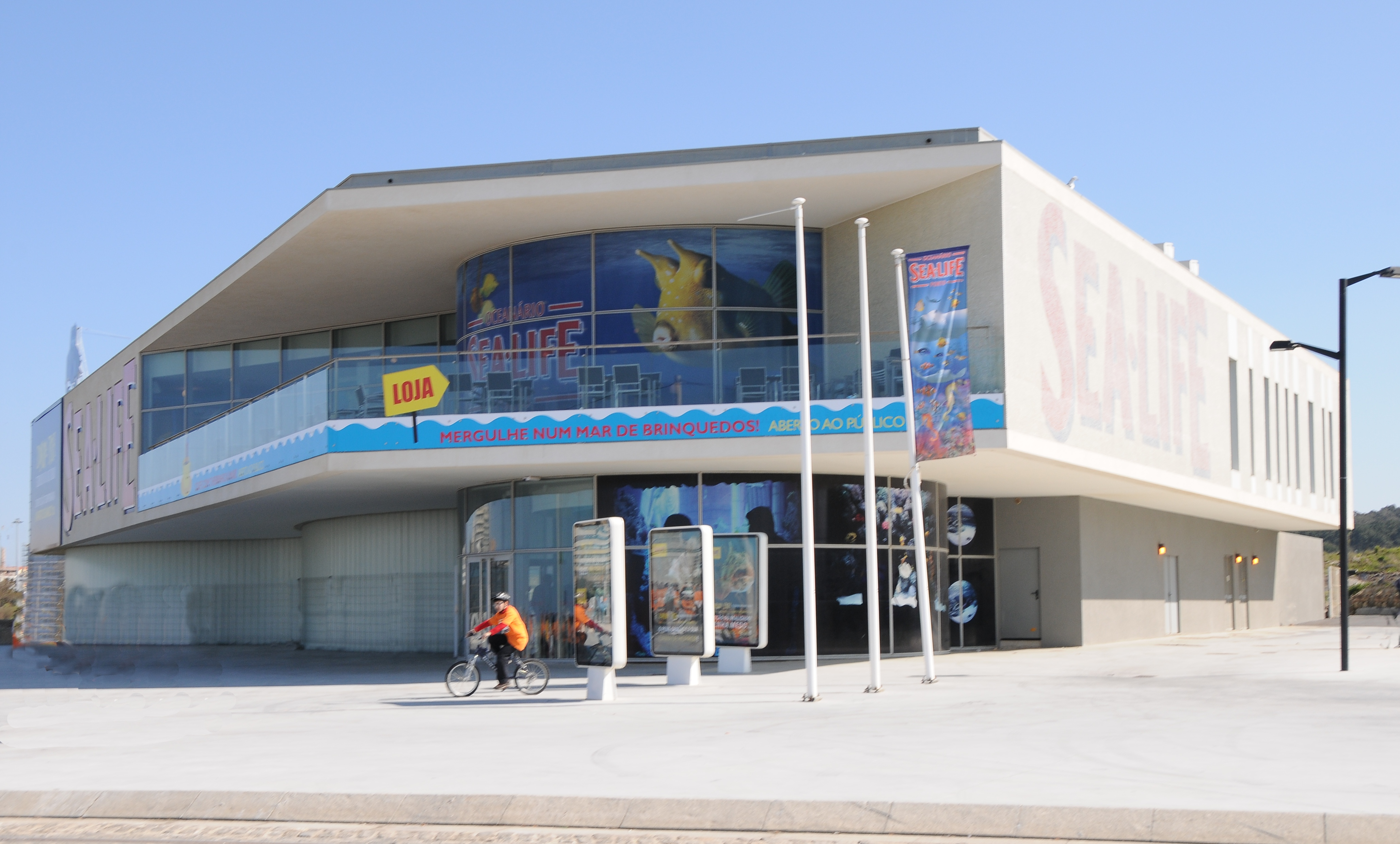
- Interactive map of Sea Life Porto
- 41°10′05″N 8°41′14″W
- Date opened: 15 June 2009
- Location: Porto, Portugal
- Website: www.visitsealife.com/Porto/

Sea Life Porto is an aquarium located in Porto, Portugal.

It opened on 15 June 2009 and is one of the Sea Life Centres in Europe, which are owned by Merlin Entertainments.
