= FC Porto (goalball) =

- Full name: Futebol Clube do Porto
- Founded: 28 September 2017 (7 years ago)
- Chairman: Jorge Nuno Pinto da Costa
- Manager: Rúben Leonel
- League: Portuguese Championship
- 2018–19: 2nd
- Website: https://www.fcporto.pt/pt/modalidades/desporto-adaptado/noticias

Integrated within the adapted sport section of FC Porto, the goalball team competes in the Portuguese National Goalball Championship organized by ANDDVIS (National Association of Sport for the Visually Impaired).

Guided by Rúben Leonel (manager) and with the coordination of Joana Teixeira (responsible for the section), the athletes perform their training and furthermore development at the Dragão Arena.

== History ==
=== Creation, purposes and first steps ===
With the 124th anniversary celebrations of the club taking place, chairman Jorge Nuno Pinto da Costa announced the creation of a goalball team in order to continue the service provided throughout the section to athletes with limitations (in this case with visual impairment) so they could practice and enjoy the pleasure of playing the sport. A cooperation was established with CCD Misericórdia Porto (House of Culture and Sport of the Workers of the Santa Casa da Misericórdia do Porto) who already had a team competing in the National Championship, thus cementing goals to develop young athletes and grant them with better working conditions for approaching a higher performance level. The defined main purpose is the growth and projection of the sport, accompanied with the intention of placing players from the squad in representation of the Portugal goalball national team.

The goalball squad for the opening season was composed of Vítor Caixeiro, Diogo Azevedo, Carlos Coutinho, Márcio Carneiro, (Note: Carneiro was part of the Portugal national squad that achieved the silver medal in the 2013 IBSA European Goalball Championship C.) Fábio Oliveira and João Macedo. (Note: Oliveira and Macedo were part of the Portugal national U21 team that conquered the silver medal in the 2017 European Para Youth Games.) They debuted in the National Championship with a 10–5 loss against Castêlo da Maia which prompted manager Lara Teixeira to explain that despite the bad start, the players were still in an adjusting and learning phase that was only going to be surpassed with hard work. Following the initial blunder the team managed to engage itself into achieving four consecutive wins, three for the championship and the elimination of CCD Misericórdia Porto from the Portuguese Cup in a 10–3 victory. A month later however, reached an outcome that dismissed their championship aspirations, after conceding two defeats against Sporting CP (A and B squads); both matches were disputed in the multi-sport pavilion of José Alvalade Stadium. The team clinched two victories in the final fixtures, secured a 4th place on the overall table standings and youngster Fábio Oliveira became the team top goalscorer for the competition having netted 24 goals. Porto concluded the competitive season with two defeats against Castêlo da Maia and AJ Pina, dictating their elimination from the Portuguese Cup.

The following season, Tiago Mendes replaced Lara Teixeira as the new manager and João Sousa joined the squad from CCD Misericórdia Porto. Prior to the start of any official competition they participated in a joint training session alongside Porto's handball team, with both sides sharing their experiences across two different sporting realities. Afterwards, they initiated the championship first round with a victory against CA Cultural. In the succeeding round, Porto was defeated by Sporting CP but assured a win against ACAPO Lisboa. On 30 March 2019, they managed to beat rivals Sporting CP for the first time with a 8–7 victory in the Portuguese Cup first round. Subsequently, the team won all remaining championship matches while also achieving another victory in the Portuguese Cup; they improved on their previous season results with a 2nd place on the standings and Fábio Oliveira stood out again as the squad top goalscorer with 21 goals in the championship. At the end of the season, Porto eliminated CD Cova da Piedade from the Portuguese Cup in a 12–2 victory and effectively reached their first final, where they ended as runner-ups after losing versus Sporting CP.

== Portugal national team contributions ==
The first major competition in which Porto players have been called to represent the Portugal national team was the 2018 IBSA Goalball European Championship B in Poland. Led by Timo Laitinen, the squad achieved an historical 5th place and was granted permanency on the European Division B.

Club athletes in representation of the national team:

- 2018 Berlin Cup Goalball Tournament: Fábio Oliveira, João Macedo and Vítor Caixeiro
- 2018 IBSA Goalball European Championship B: Fábio Oliveira and João Macedo
- 2019 European Para Youth Games: Fábio Oliveira, João Macedo and João Sousa
- 2019 FEDC International Goalball Tournament: Fábio Oliveira, João Macedo and João Sousa

== Seasons overview ==
Note: Porto score is always listed first

| Season | Competition | Date | Opponent | Result |
|---|---|---|---|---|
| 2017–18 | Championship | 11 November 2017 | Castêlo da Maia | 5–10 |
| 2017–18 | Championship | 16 December 2017 | CCD Misericórdia Porto | 8–2 |
| 2017–18 | Cup | 6 January 2018 | CCD Misericórdia Porto | 10–3 |
| 2017–18 | Championship | 27 January 2018 | CA Cultural | 4–3 |
| 2017–18 | Championship | 27 January 2018 | AJ Pina | 13–7 |
| 2017–18 | Championship | 24 February 2018 | Sporting CP (B) | 3–13 |
| 2017–18 | Championship | 24 February 2018 | Sporting CP (A) | 1–11 |
| 2017–18 | Championship | 7 April 2018 | ACAPO Lisboa | 10–3 |
| 2017–18 | Championship | 12 May 2018 | ACAPO Porto/CD Fiães | 12–2 |
| 2017–18 | Cup | 26 May 2018 | Castêlo da Maia | 12–15 |
| 2017–18 | Cup | 26 May 2018 | AJ Pina | 5–7 |
| 2018–19 | Championship | 9 February 2019 | CA Cultural | 13–6 |
| 2018–19 | Championship | 9 March 2019 | Sporting CP | 1–11 |
| 2018–19 | Championship | 9 March 2019 | ACAPO Lisboa | 14–4 |
| 2018–19 | Cup | 30 March 2019 | Sporting CP | 8–7 |
| 2018–19 | Championship | 6 May 2019 | Castêlo da Maia | 8–3 |
| 2018–19 | Championship | 6 May 2019 | AJ Pina | 10–0 |
| 2018–19 | Cup | 25 May 2019 | Castêlo da Maia | 9–7 |
| 2018–19 | Championship | 6 July 2019 | ACAPO Porto/CD Fiães | 10–0 |
| 2018–19 | Championship | 6 July 2019 | CD Cova da Piedade | 15–5 |
| 2018–19 | Cup | 20 July 2019 | CD Cova da Piedade | 12–2 |
| 2018–19 | Cup | 20 July 2019 | Sporting CP | 3–13 |
| 2018–19 | Cup | 20 July 2019 | Sporting CP | 1–11 |
| 2019–20 | Supercup | 12 October 2019 | Sporting CP | 6–14 |
| 2019–20 | Supercup | 12 October 2019 | Sporting CP | 3–10 |
| 2019–20 | Championship | 9 November 2019 | CD Cova da Piedade | 10–7 |
| 2019–20 | Championship | 9 November 2019 | Sporting CP | 11–9 |
| 2019–20 | Championship | 23 November 2019 | ACAPO Porto | 10–0 |
| 2019–20 | Championship | 23 November 2019 | CA Cultural/SCP | 12–2 |
| 2019–20 | Championship | 14 December 2019 | ACAPO Lisboa | 18–8 |
| 2019–20 | Championship | 14 December 2019 | AJ Pina | 10–0 |
| 2019–20 | Cup | 25 January 2020 | Sporting CP | 2–12 |
| 2019–20 | Championship | 8 February 2020 | Castêlo da Maia | 13–3 |

== Current squad ==
The following players compose the squad for the 2019–20 season

Squad
| Nº | Nat. | Athlete | Birth and Age |
|---|---|---|---|
| 1 | (Portugal) | Diogo Azevedo | 20 October 1998 (age 26) |
| 3 | (Portugal) | Fábio Oliveira | 12 May 1999 (age 26) |
| 5 | (Portugal) | Márcio Carneiro | 9 September 1977 (age 47) |
| 6 | (Portugal) | João Macedo | 30 April 1997 (age 28) |
| 7 | (Portugal) | Vítor Caixeiro (c) | 7 July 1978 (age 47) |
| 8 | (Portugal) | João Sousa | 9 October 2000 (age 24) |
| 9 | (Portugal) | Carlos Coutinho | 1 July 1981 (age 44) |
