= Palácio da Bolsa =

Historical building in Porto, Portugal

Coordinates: 41.141367°N 8.615428°W

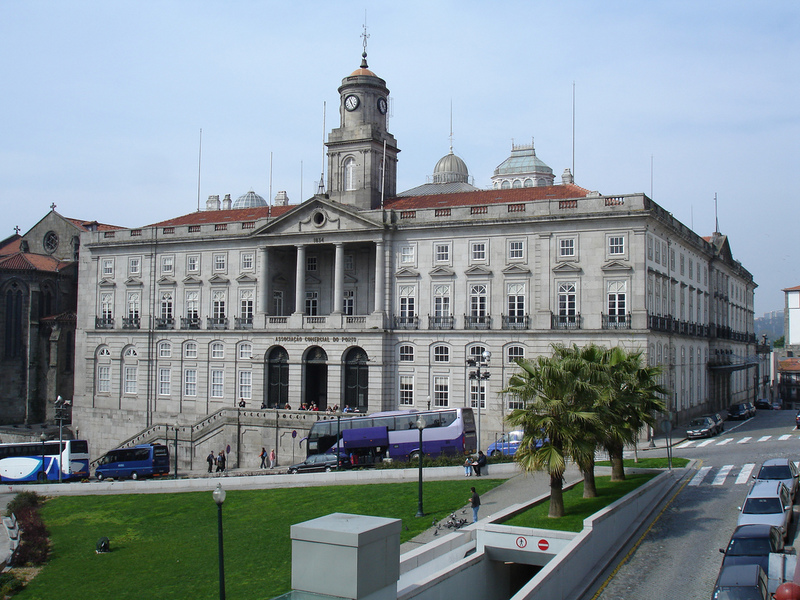
Palácio da Bolsa, view from the front.

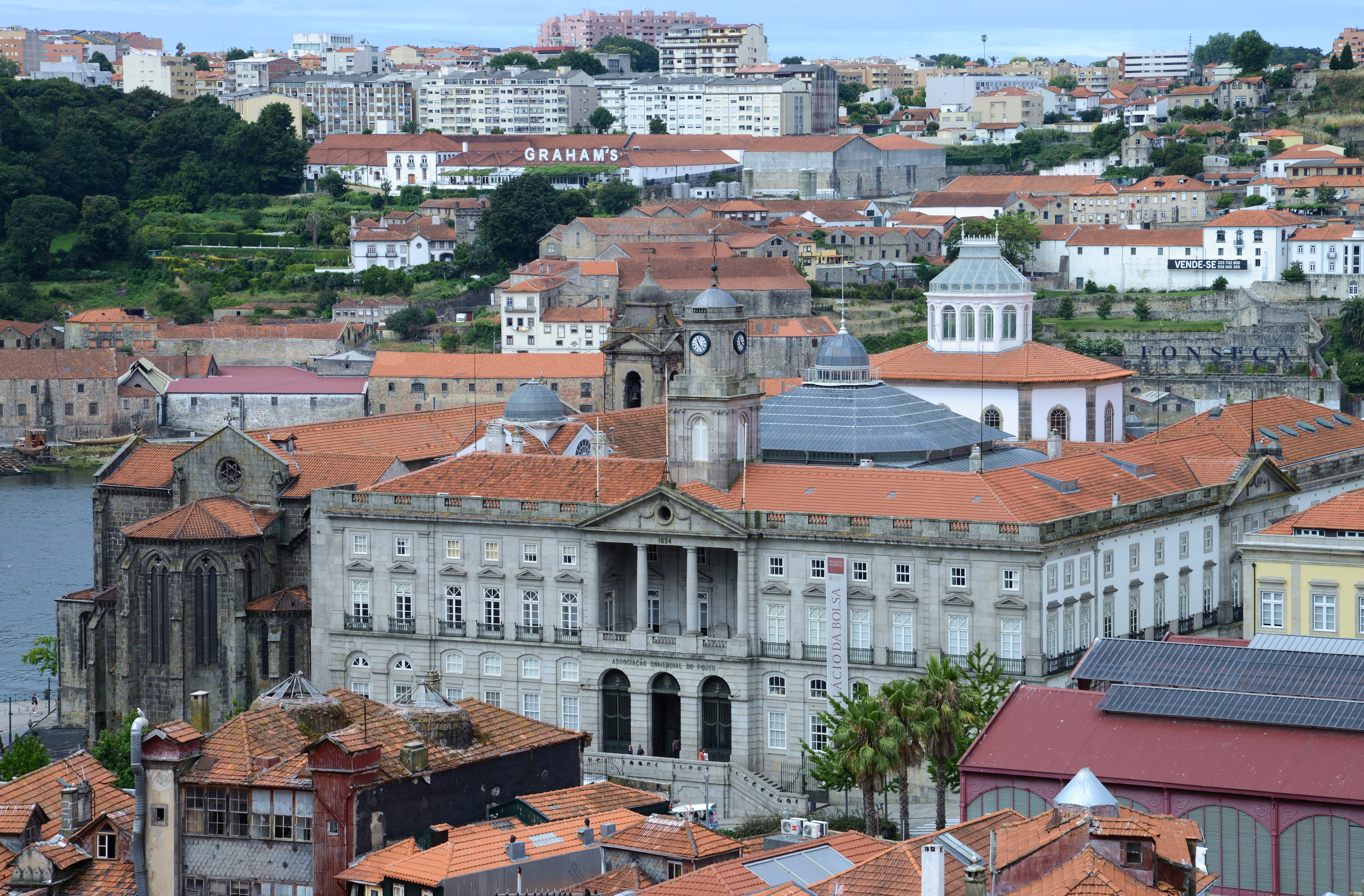
Palácio da Bolsa, view from near the Porto cathedral

The Stock Exchange Palace (Portuguese: Palácio da Bolsa) is a historical building in Porto, Portugal. The palace was built in the 19th century by the city's Commercial Association (Portuguese: Associação Comercial do Porto) in Neoclassical style. It is located in the Infante D. Henrique Square in the historical centre of Porto, designated World Heritage Site by UNESCO.

== History ==
The Palácio da Bolsa is located beside the St Francis Church of Porto, which was once part of the St Francis Convent, founded in the 13th century. In 1832, during the Liberal Wars, a fire destroyed the cloisters of the convent, sparing the church. In 1841, Queen Mary II donated the convent ruins to the merchants of the city, who decided to use the spot to build the seat of the Commercial Association.

Building work began in 1842 following the plans of Porto architect Joaquim da Costa Lima Júnior, who designed a Neoclassical palace of Palladian influence, inspired by previous structures built in the city. Most of the palace was finished by 1850, but the decoration of the interior was only completed in 1910 and involved several different artists.

The Palácio da Bolsa has been classified as a National Monument since 1982.

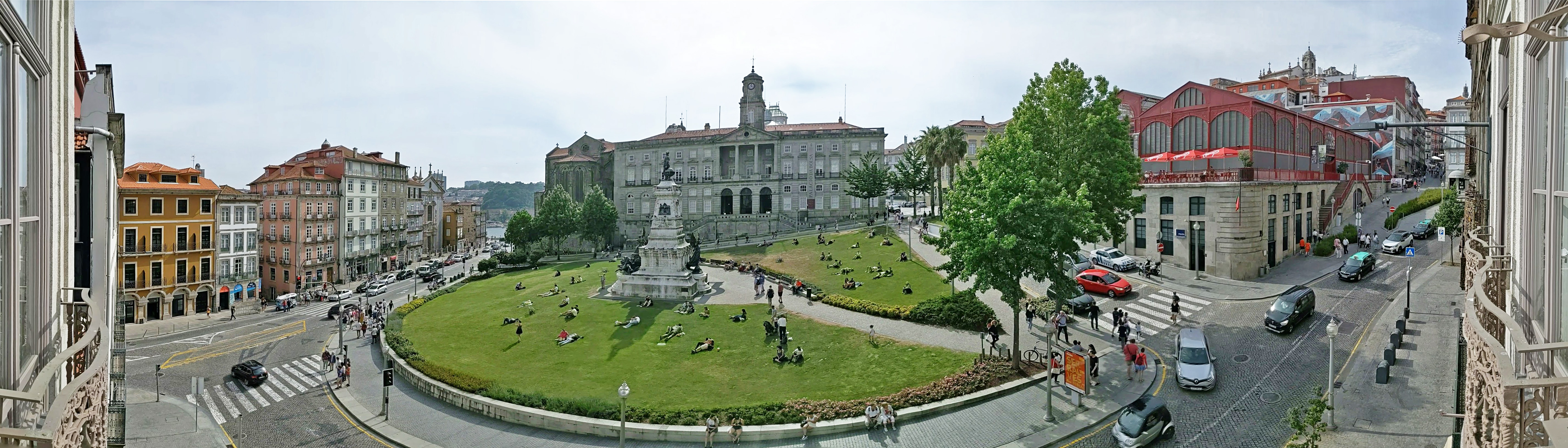
The Palácio da Bolsa at Jardim do Infante Dom Henrique – panoramic view from a balcony across the street

== Art and architecture ==
The first architect of the Palácio was Joaquim da Costa Lima Júnior, who was in charge of the project from 1840 until 1860. He was responsible for the general design of the building, inspired by the Neopalladian architecture that was in fashion in Porto since the late 18th century, expressed in buildings like the Hospital of St Anthony (by English architect John Carr), the English Factory (by another Englishman, John Whitehead) and several projects by Portuguese architect Carlos Amarante.

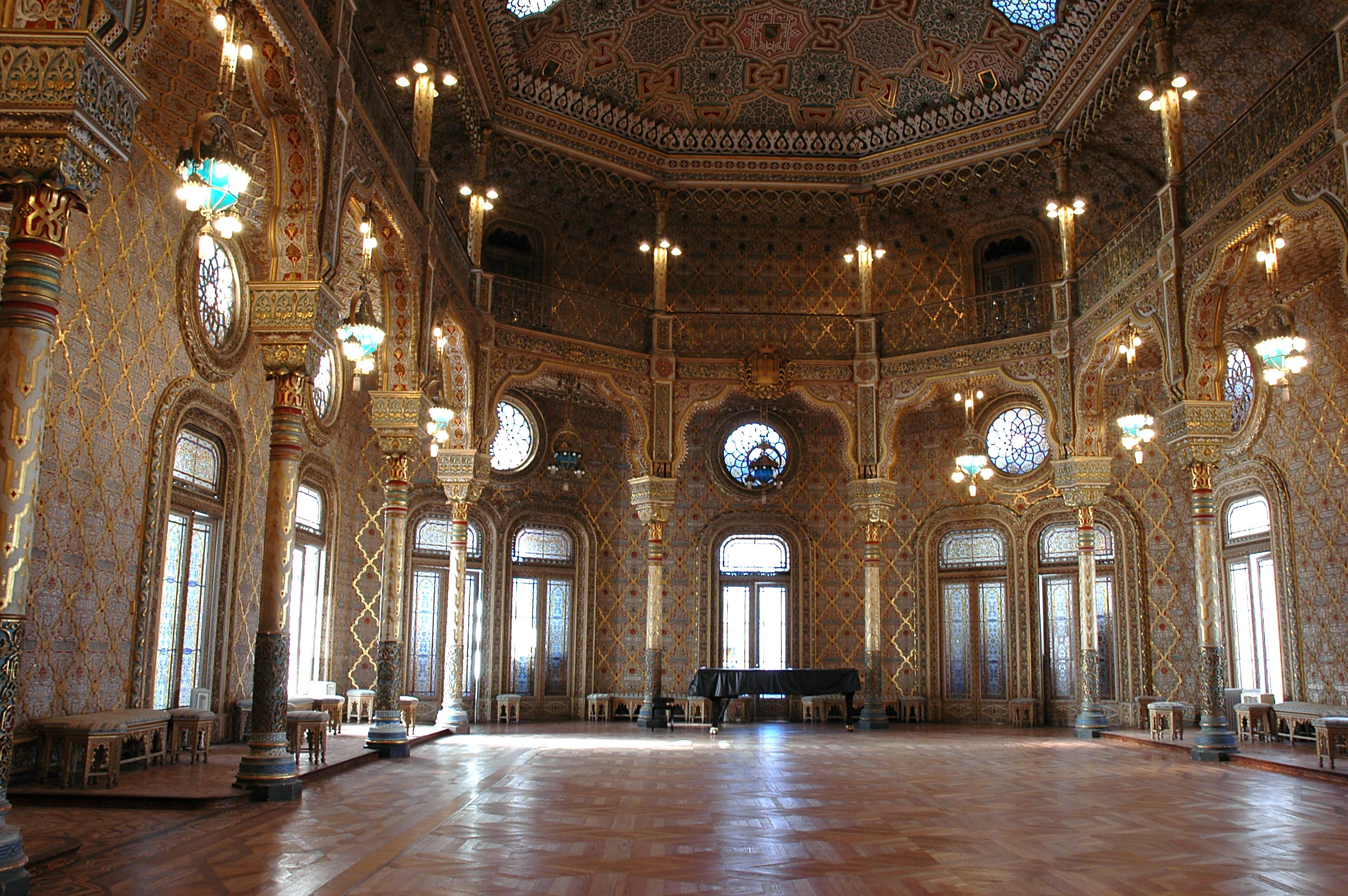
Moorish Revival Arab room. There are two inscriptions located in the walls. One roughly translating to "With the divine support of God" and another roughly translating to "Glory to the late Mary II"

The general structure of the Palácio was completed by 1850, but several architectural details were later entrusted to architects Gustavo Adolfo Gonçalves e Sousa (author of the stairway and the Arab Room), Tomás Augusto Soler (metallic dome of the courtyard) and Joel da Silva Pereira (Tribunal Room), among others.

The interior of the Palace, only finished in 1910, was magnificently decorated by several artists. The central courtyard (Nations' Courtyard - Pátio das Nações) is covered by a large metallic, octagonal dome with glass panels, designed by Tomás Soler and built after 1880. The lower part of the dome is decorated with the painted coats-of-arms of Portugal and the countries with which Portugal had commercial relations in the 19th century. To the back of the courtyard, a sumptuous stairway, built in 1868 by Gonçalves e Sousa, leads to the upper storeys and is adorned with busts by celebrated sculptors António Soares dos Reis and António Teixeira Lopes. The ceiling frescoes were painted by António Ramalho.

Several rooms of the Palace - Tribunal Room, Assembly Room, Golden Room - display furniture by José Marques da Silva, allegoric paintings by José Maria Veloso Salgado and João Marques de Oliveira, sculptures by Teixeira Lopes and many other works of art. The highlight of the Palace is, however, the Arab Room, built between 1862 and 1880 by Gonçalves e Sousa. The room is decorated in the exotic Moorish Revival style, fashionable in the 19th century, and is used as reception hall for personalities and heads of state visiting Porto.

== See also ==
- List of National Monuments in Portugal
