= Jardim do Morro station =

Light rail station on the Porto Metro in Vila Nova de Gaia, Portugal

Jardim do Morro
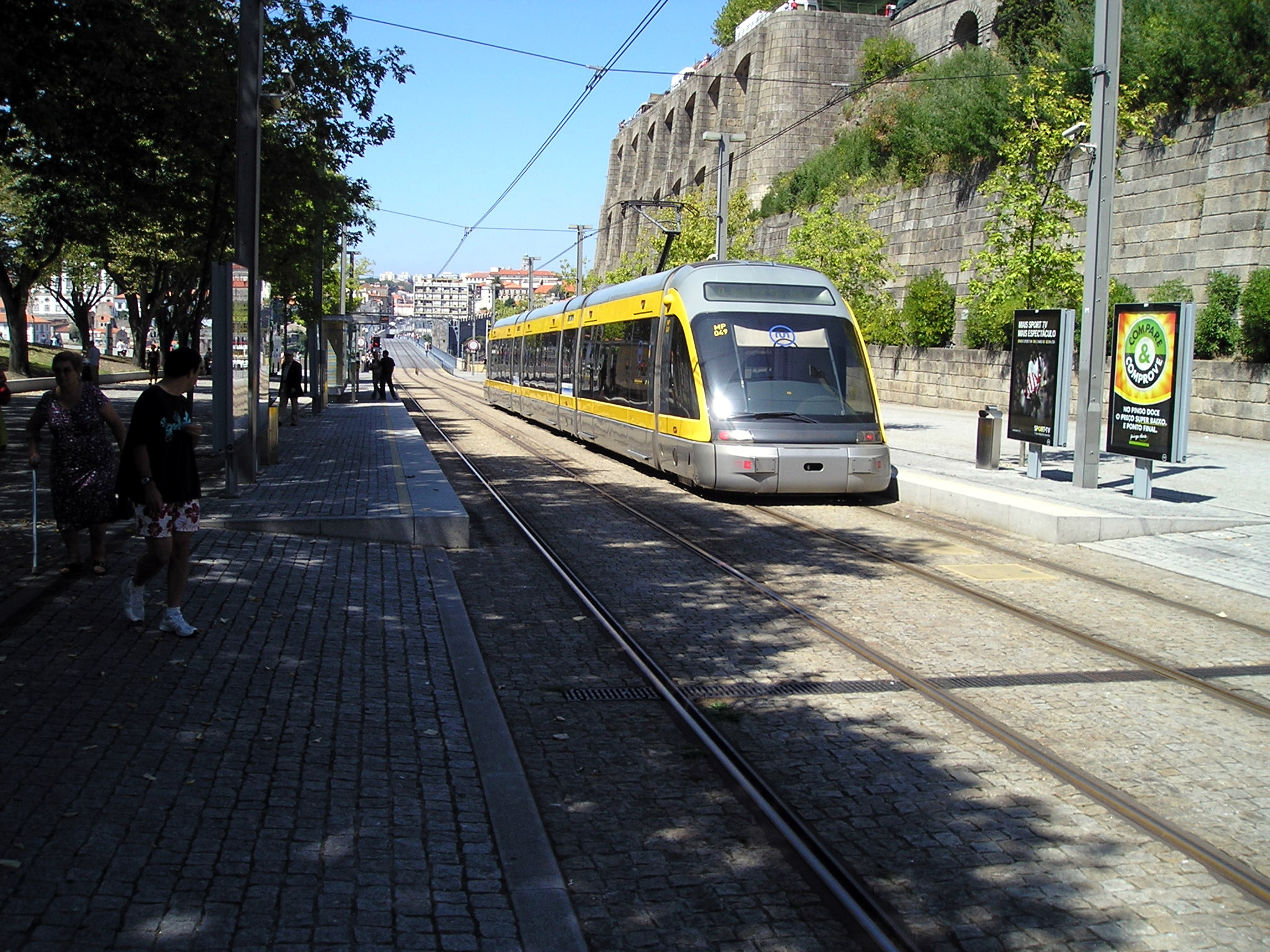
- The station looking north, with the Serra do Pilar Monastery to the right and the Dom Luís I Bridge in the distance

General information
- Location: Vila Nova de Gaia; Portugal
- Coordinates: 41°8′15.63″N 8°36′31.06″W
- System: Porto Metro station
- Platforms: 2 side platforms
- Tracks: 2

Construction
- Structure type: At grade
- Accessible: Yes

History
- Opened: 17 September 2005

Services
Preceding station	Porto Metro	Following station
Faria Guimarães towards Hospital de São João	Line D	General Torres towards Vila d'Este
Non-rail connection
Preceding station	Gaia Cable Car	Following station
Cais de Gaia lower terminal	Gaia Cable Car	Terminus
Location

Jardim do Morro is a light rail station on line D of the Porto Metro system in Vila Nova de Gaia, Portugal. It is situated on the Avenida da República immediately to the south of the upper level of the Dom Luís I Bridge, which the trains use to cross over the Douro river from Porto. It is adjacent to the Jardim do Morro, the Serra do Pilar Monastery and the upper station of the Gaia Cable Car.

The initial section of line D, including Jardim do Morro station, opened on 17 September 2005, with trains initially running between Câmara de Gaia, to the south, and Pólo Universitário to the north. The line has since been extended from Câmara de Gaia to Vila d’Este, and from Pólo Universitário to Hospital de São João.

The station is preceded by São Bento and followed by General Torres stations. On weekdays, trains run every five to six minutes, declining to every 10 minutes on weekends and evenings.

The station platforms are on the surface, and there are two through tracks, each served by a side platform. The platforms are directly accessible from the Avenida da República. The Gaia Cable Car provides a link from Jardim do Morro to the riverside promenade of Cais de Gaia, with several nearby Port wine cellars, along with restaurants, cafes and a departure point for Douro river cruises.

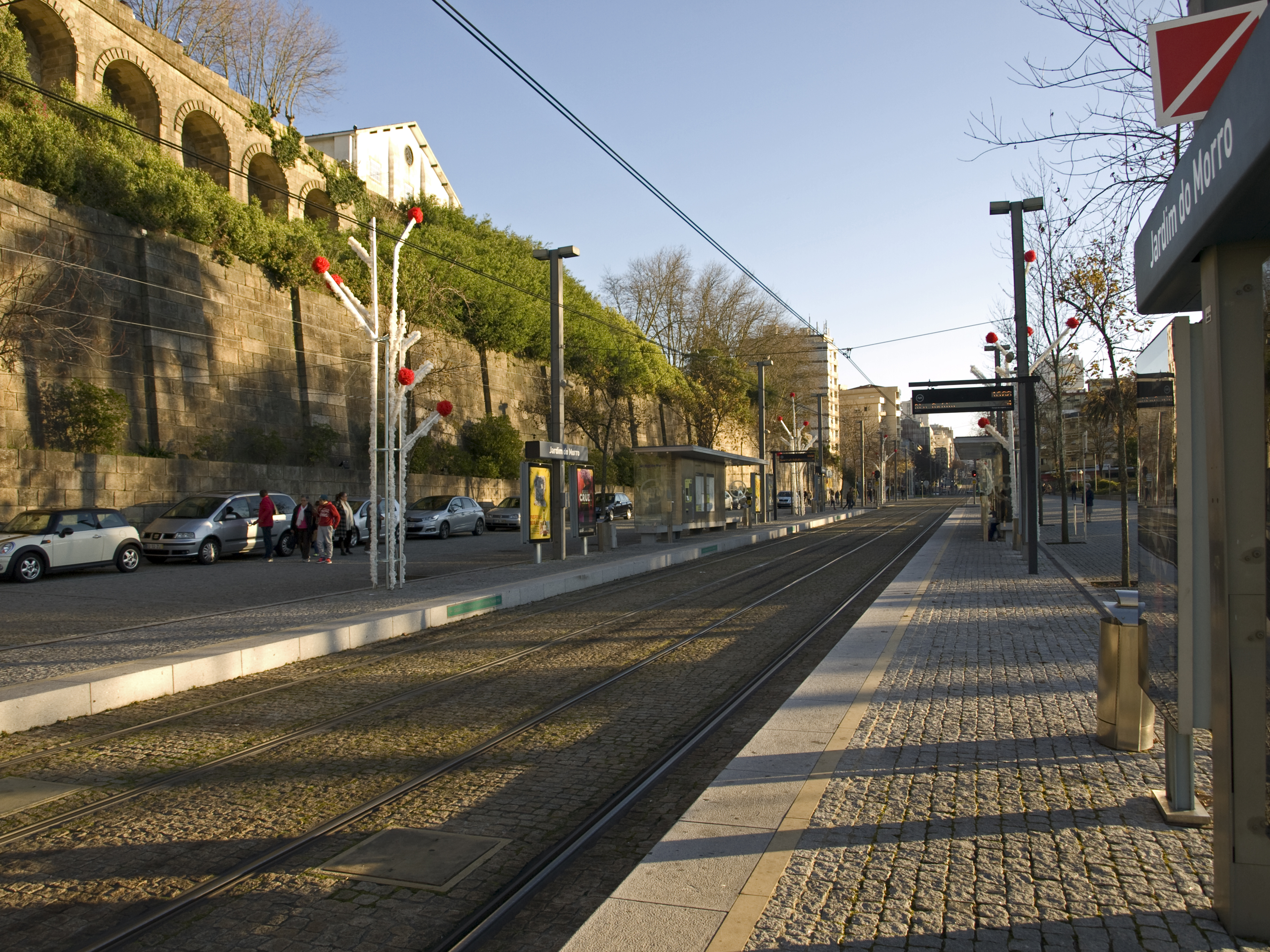
The station looking south, with the Serra do Pilar Monastery to the left

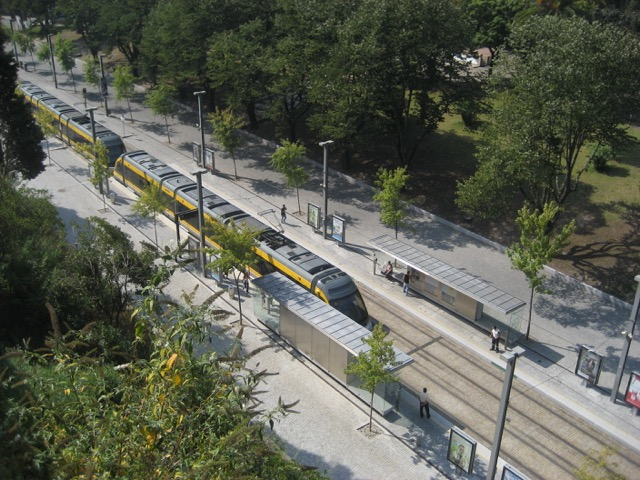
The station seen from the Serra do Pilar Monastery

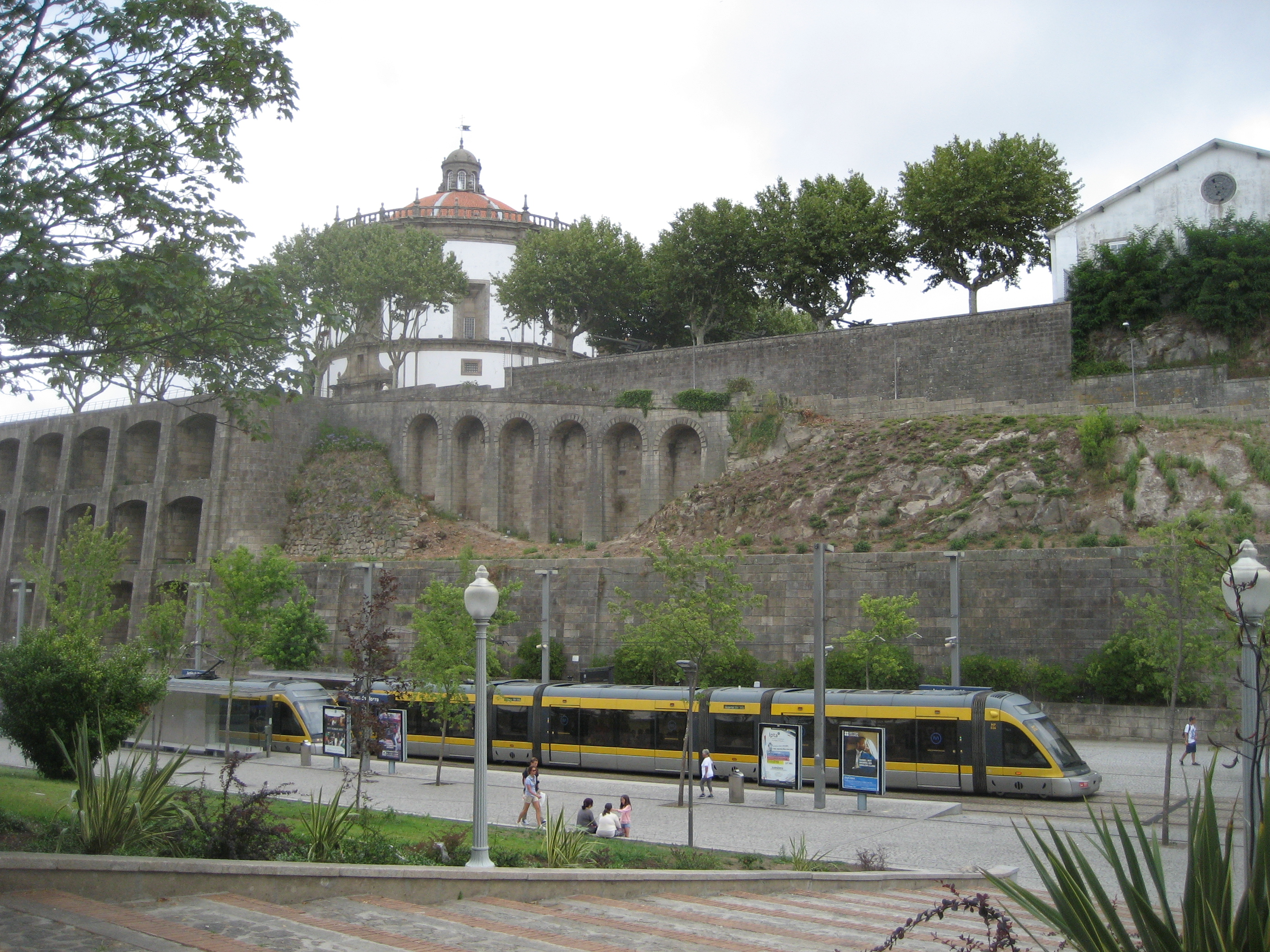
The station seen from the Jardim do Morro, with Serra do Pilar Monastery behind
