= São Bento station (Porto Metro) =

Underground light rail station on the Porto Metro in Porto, Portugal

São Bento
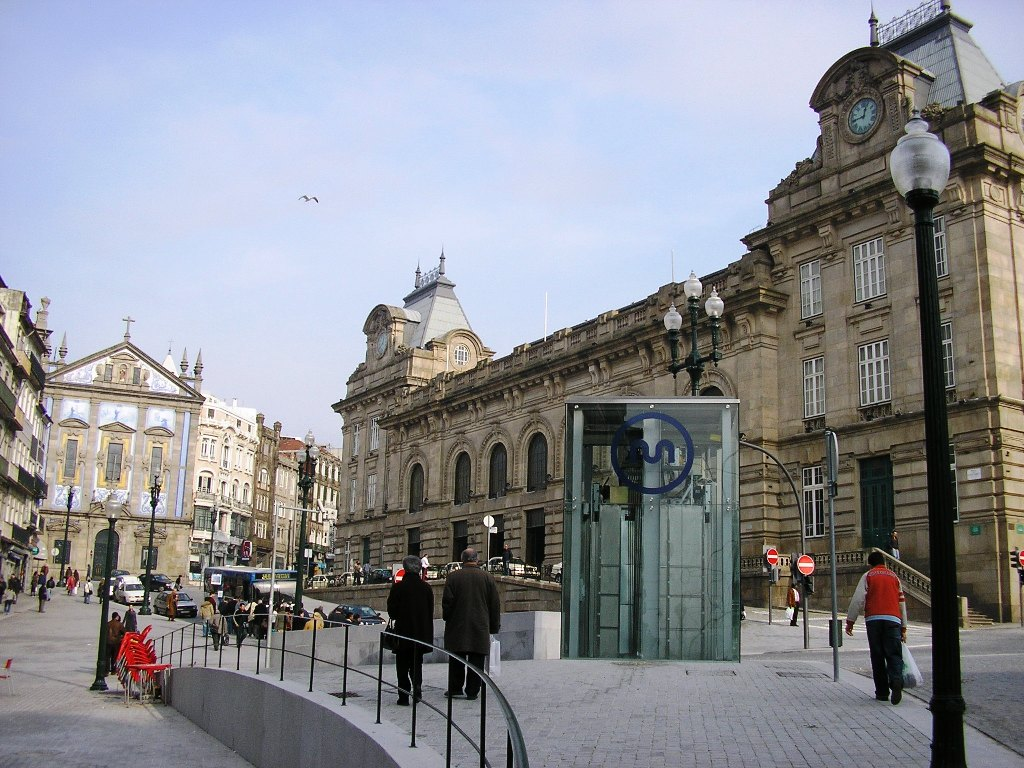
- Entrance to the underground station, with the main line station in background

General information
- Location: Porto; Portugal
- Coordinates: 41°08′41.63″N 8°36′39″W
- System: Porto Metro station
- Platforms: 2 side platforms
- Tracks: 2

Construction
- Structure type: Underground
- Accessible: Yes

History
- Opened: 17 September 2005

Services
| Preceding station | Porto Metro | Following station |
|---|---|---|
| Aliados towards Hospital de São João | Line D | Faria Guimarães towards Vila d'Este |

Future services
| Preceding station | Porto Metro | Following station |
|---|---|---|
| Terminus | Line G | Hospital de Santo António towards Casa da Música |
Location

São Bento is an underground light rail station on line D of the Porto Metro system in Porto, Portugal. It is situated in front of the São Bento railway station, one of Porto's main railway stations, from which it takes its name. Immediately to the south of São Bento station, the line emerges from its tunnel in order to use the upper level of the Dom Luís I Bridge to cross over the Douro river.

The central tunnelled section of line D, including São Bento station, opened on 17 September 2005, with trains initially running between Câmara de Gaia, to the south, and Pólo Universitário to the north. The line has since been extended from Câmara de Gaia to Vila d’Este, and from Pólo Universitário to Hospital de São João.

The station is preceded by Aliados and followed by Jardim do Morro stations. On weekdays, trains run every five to six minutes, declining to every 10 minutes on weekends and evenings.

The station platforms are underground, and there are two through tracks, each served by a side platform. The platforms are accessed from above via a sub-surface concourse, which is itself accessed from a number of street entrances and by a link corridor from São Bento railway station.

Plans were announced in 2017 to build an underground Line G which would connect São Bento with Casa da Música. The construction started in 2020 and Porto Metro expects it to be completed by the end of 2026.

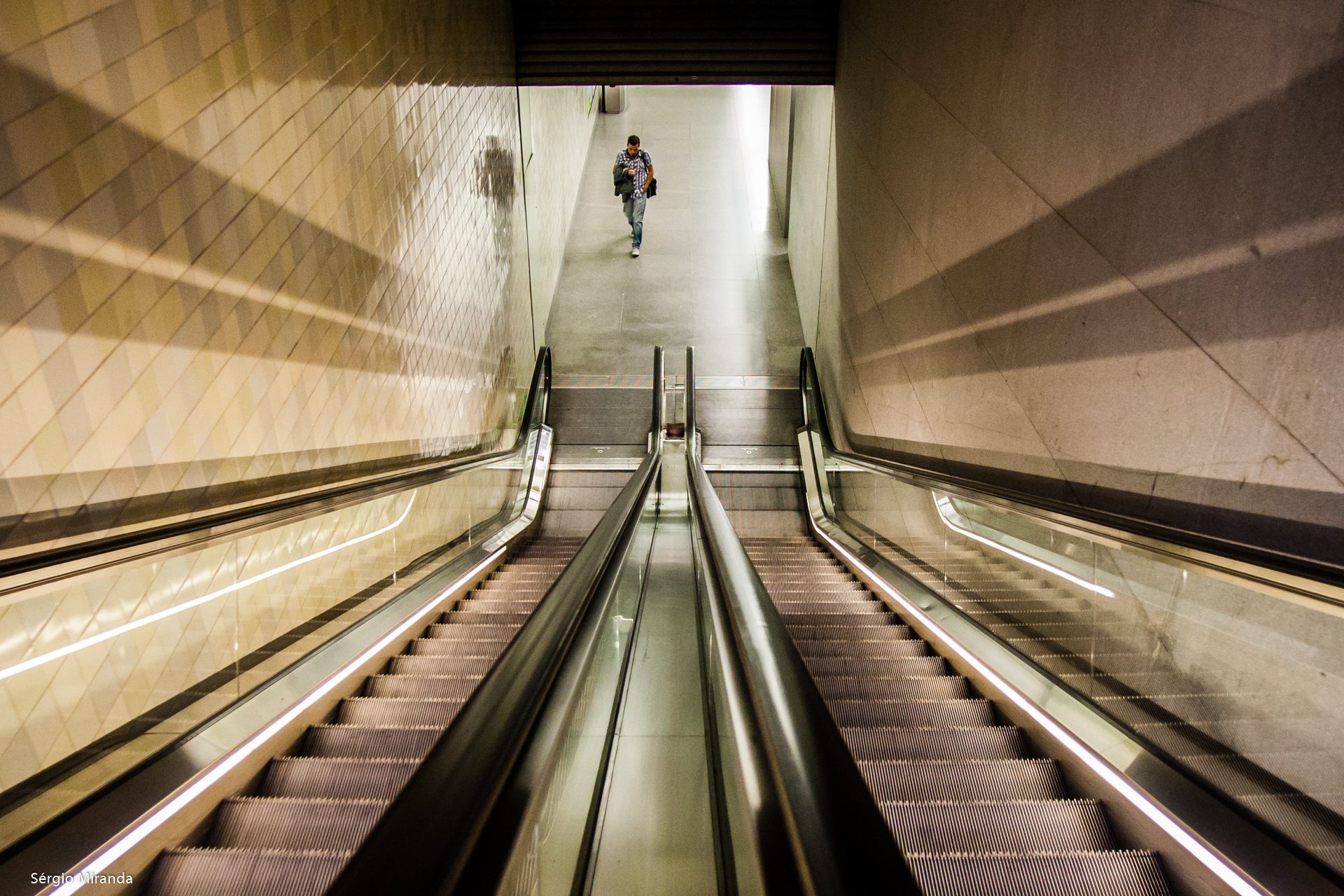
Escalators down to platforms

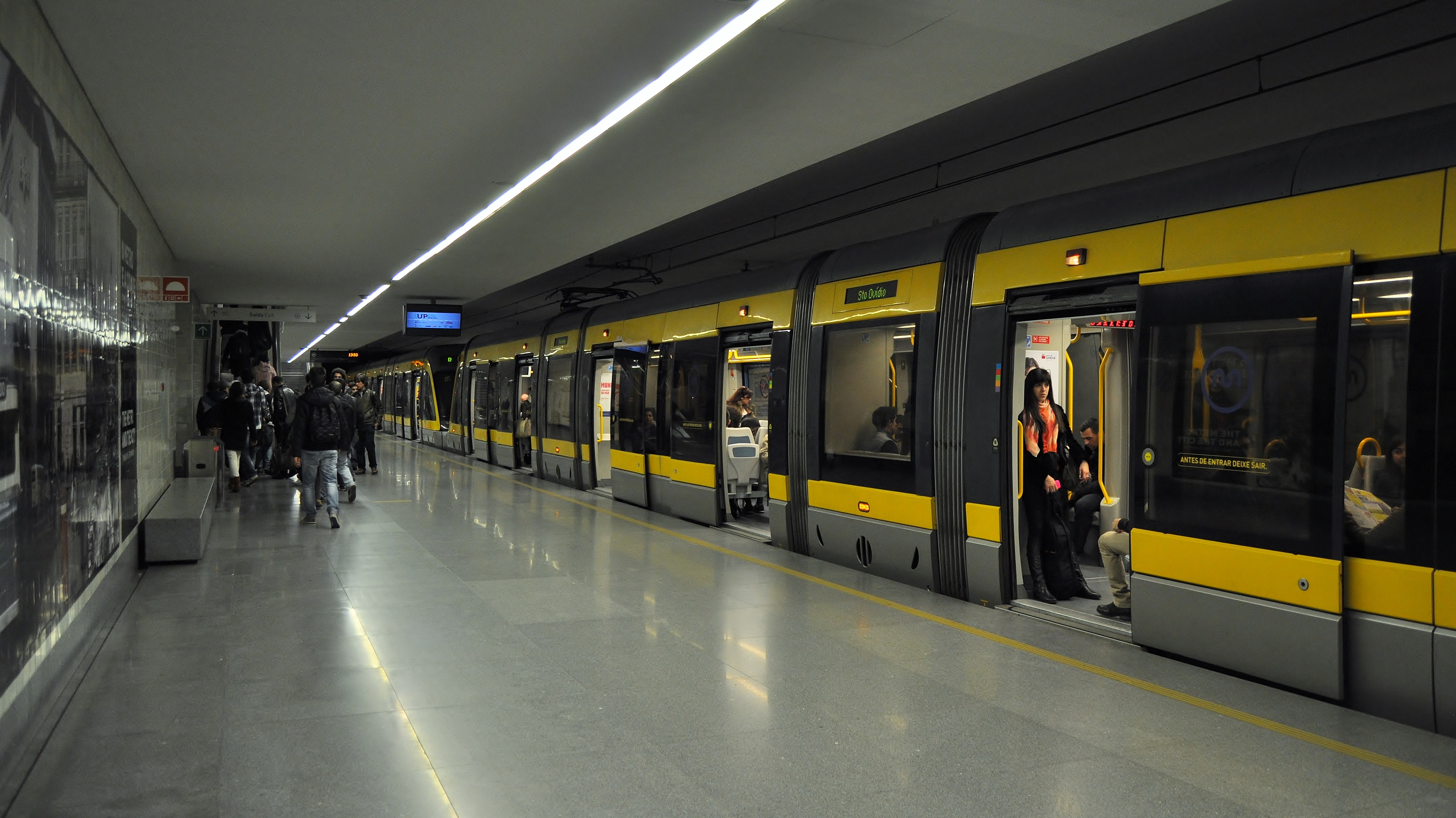
Station platforms

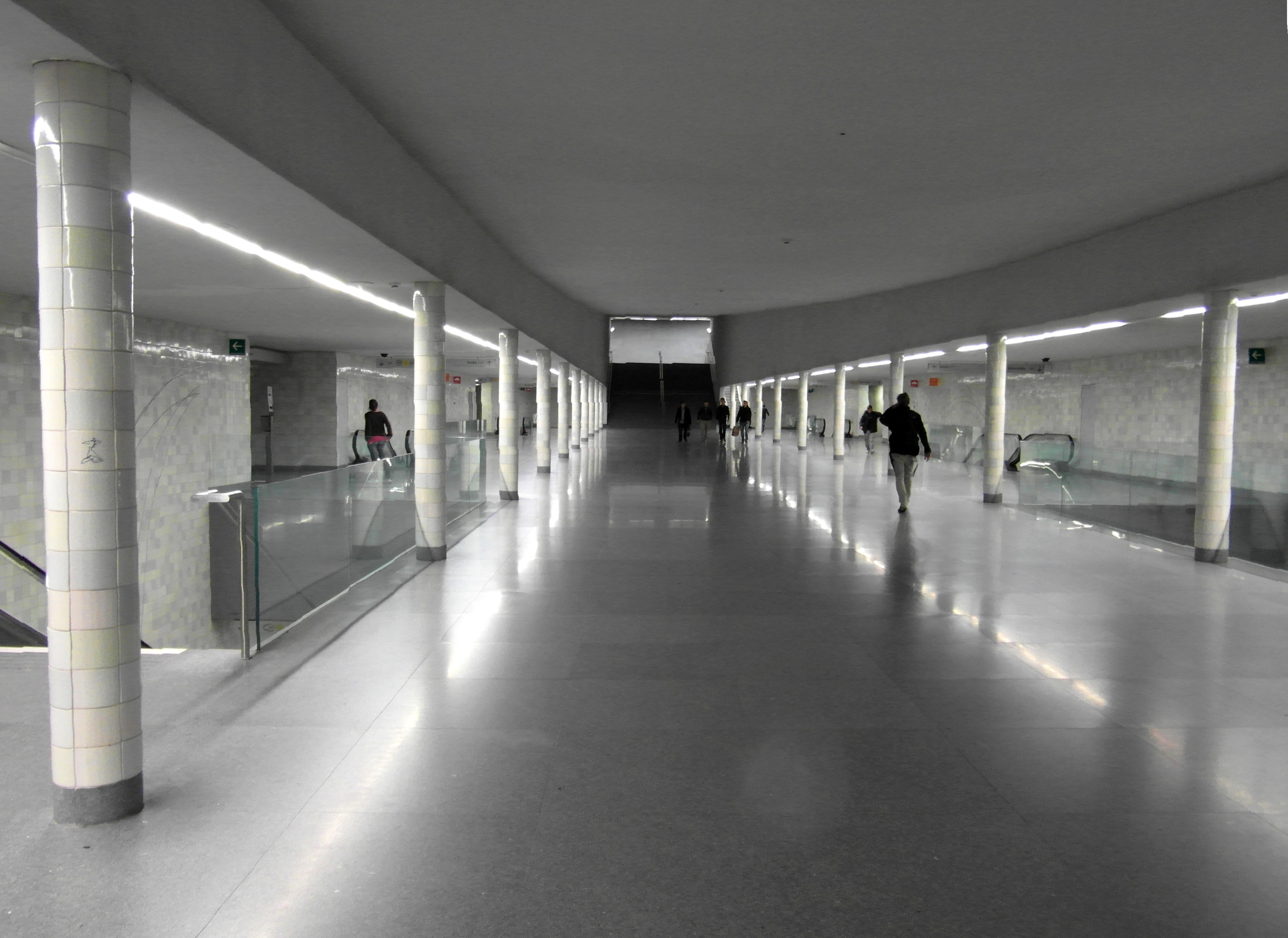
Station concourse
