= Faria Guimarães station =

Underground light rail station on the Porto Metro in Porto, Portugal

Faria Guimarães
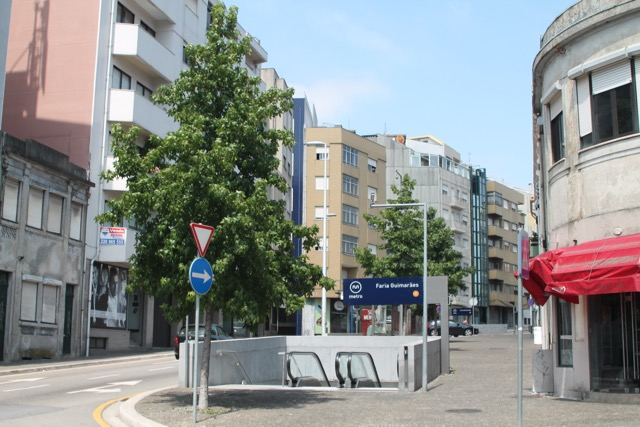
- Entrance to the station

General information
- Location: Porto; Portugal
- Coordinates: 41°9′26.1″N 8°36′32.78″W
- System: Porto Metro station
- Platforms: 2 side platforms
- Tracks: 2

Construction
- Structure type: Underground
- Accessible: Yes

History
- Opened: 17 September 2005

Services
Preceding station	Porto Metro	Following station
São Bento towards Hospital de São João	Line D	Jardim do Morro towards Vila d'Este
Location

Faria Guimarães is an underground light rail station on line D of the Porto Metro system in Porto, Portugal. It is situated under Rua de Faria Guimarães, from which it takes its name, at its intersection with Rua do Paraíso.

The central tunnelled section of line D, including Faria Guimarães station, opened on 17 September 2005, with trains initially running between Câmara de Gaia, to the south, and Pólo Universitário to the north. The line has since been extended from Câmara de Gaia to Vila d’Este, and from Pólo Universitário to Hospital de São João.

The station is preceded by Trindade and followed by Marquês stations. On weekdays, trains run every five to six minutes, declining to every 10 minutes on weekends and evenings. The station platforms are underground, and there are two through tracks, each served by a side platform.
