= General Torres station (Porto Metro) =

Light rail station on the Porto Metro in Vila Nova de Gaia, Portugal

General Torres
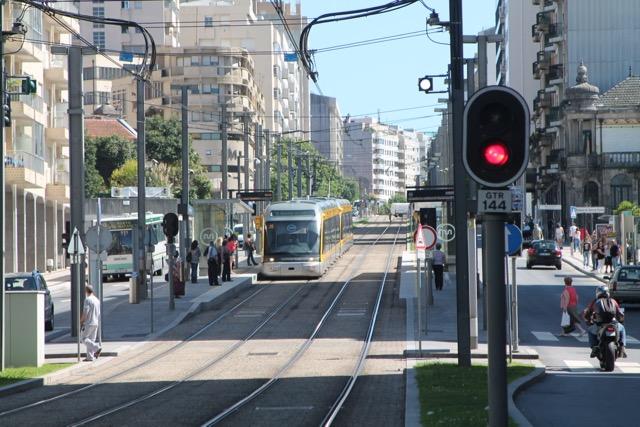

General information
- Location: Vila Nova de Gaia; Portugal
- Coordinates: 41°8′2.50″N 8°36′27″W
- System: Porto Metro station
- Platforms: 2 side platforms
- Tracks: 2

Construction
- Structure type: At grade
- Accessible: Yes

History
- Opened: 17 September 2005

Services
Preceding station	Porto Metro	Following station
Jardim do Morro towards Hospital de São João	Line D	Câmara de Gaia towards Vila d'Este
Location

General Torres is a light rail station on line D of the Porto Metro system in Vila Nova de Gaia, Portugal. It is situated on the Avenida da República some 100 metres (330 ft) from the entrance to the General Torres railway station, served by suburban trains on the Linha do Norte.

The initial section of line D, including General Torres station, opened on 17 September 2005, with trains initially running between Câmara de Gaia, to the south, and Pólo Universitário to the north. The line has since been extended from Câmara de Gaia to Vila d’Este, and from Pólo Universitário to Hospital de São João.

The station is preceded by Jardim do Morro and followed by Câmara de Gaia stations. On weekdays, trains run every five to six minutes, declining to every 10 minutes on weekends and evenings. The station platforms are on the surface, and there are two through tracks, each served by a side platform. The platforms are directly accessible from the Avenida da República.
