= General Torres station =

General Torres station may refer to:

- General Torres railway station, a railway station on the suburban Aveiro line in Vila Nova de Gaia, Portugal
- General Torres station (Porto Metro), a light rail station on the Porto Metro in Vila Nova de Gaia, Portugal
