= IPO station =

Light rail station on the Porto Metro in Porto, Portugal

IPO
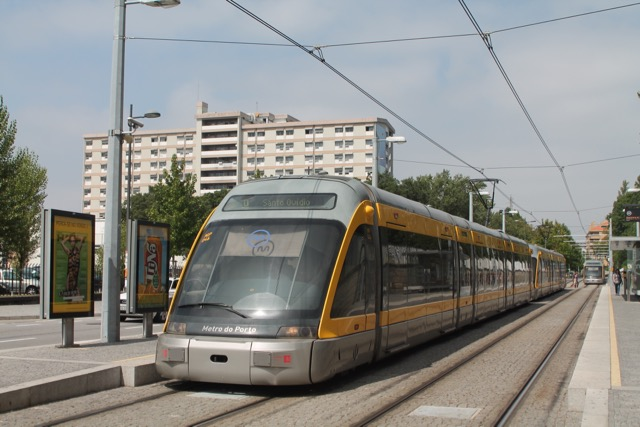

General information
- Location: Portugal
- Coordinates: 41°10′52″N 8°36′16″W
- System: Porto Metro station
- Platforms: 2 side platforms
- Tracks: 2

Construction
- Structure type: At Grade
- Accessible: Yes

History
- Opened: 31 March 2006

Services
Preceding station	Porto Metro	Following station
Hospital de São João Terminus	Line D	Pólo Universitário towards Vila d'Este
Location

IPO is a light rail station on line D of the Porto Metro system in Porto, Portugal. It is situated on the Rua Dr. António Bernardino de Almeidaat at the northern end of the University of Porto campus and is named after the nearby Instituto Português de Oncologia (Portuguese Oncology Institute).

The station is preceded by Hospital de São João station, the northern terminus of line D, and followed by Pólo Universitário station. On weekdays, trains run every five to six minutes, declining to every 10 minutes on weekends and evenings. The station platforms are on the surface, and are directly accessed from the Rua Dr. António Bernardino de Almeida. There are two through tracks, each served by a side platform.

Although the central section of line D opened in 2005, the IPO and Hospital de São João stations did not open until 31 March 2006, with the line terminating at Pólo Universitário station in the interim. This was because the Escola Superior de Enfermagem, a nursing school, objected to the new line because of safety concerns from the trains running near the entrance of the school. Before opening, the sidewalk was set back and a traffic light was placed at the intersection to reduce the risk of accidents between trains and cars.

Between 29 August 2021 and 28 January 2022, Hospital de São João station was closed for a renovation project. During this period, alternate trains terminated at IPO and Pólo Universitário stations.

== See also ==
- IPO (disambiguation)
