= Gaia Cable Car =

Gondola lift in Vila Nova de Gaia, Porto, Portugal

- Teleférico de Gaia
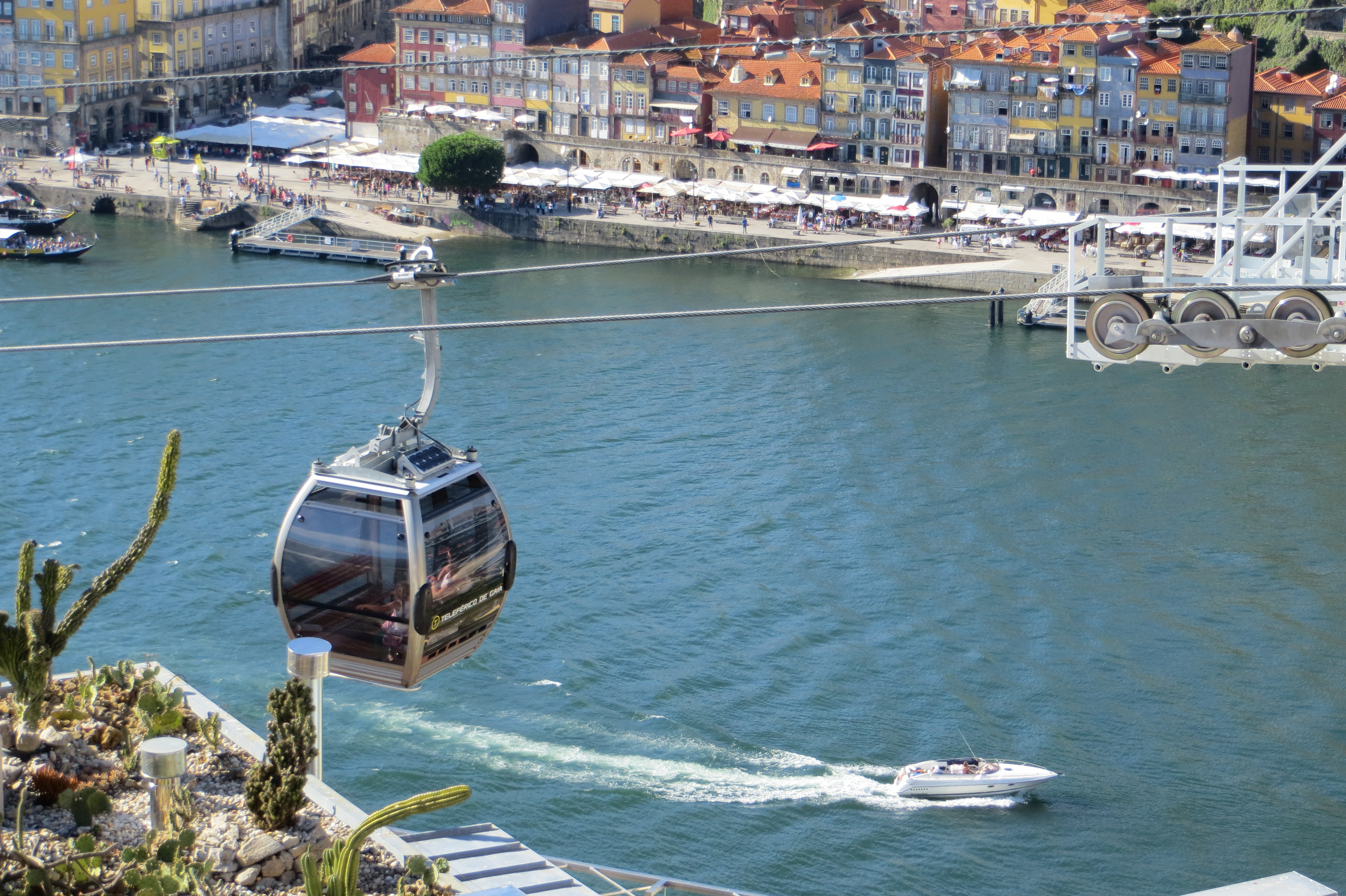
- The cable car, with the Porto waterfront opposite
- Interactive map of Gaia Cable Car

Overview
- Status: Operational
- Location: Vila Nova de Gaia; Porto; Portugal
- Coordinates: 41.1377°N 8.6126°W
- Termini: Jardim do Morro; Cais de Gaia
- No. of stations: 2
- Open: 2011
- Website: https://gaiacablecar.com/

Operation
- Operator: Telef - Transportes por Cabo e Concessões, SA

Technical features
- Aerial lift type: Mono-cable gondola detachable
- Manufactured by: Doppelmayr
- Line length: 562 metres (1,844 ft)
- Operating speed: 4 m/s (13 ft/s)

The Gaia Cable Car, or Teleférico de Gaia, is a monocable gondola lift located in Vila Nova de Gaia, across the Douro river from the Portuguese city of Porto. The upper station is located next to Jardim do Morro station of the Porto Metro, the upper level of the Dom Luís I Bridge, and the Serra do Pilar Monastery. The lower station is on the riverside promenade of Cais de Gaia, with several nearby Port wine cellars, along with restaurants, cafes and a departure point for Douro river cruises.

The line was built by Doppelmayr at a cost of €12 million, and is operated by the company Telef - Transportes por Cabo e Concessões, SA. Construction commenced in March 2009, and the line entered service in April 2011. As of November 2024, the line runs every day except Christmas Day, with services starting at 10:00 and ending between 18:00 and 20:00 depending on the season. Tickets can be bought at either station or online, but Andante tickets cannot be used. As of 2026, the ride per passenger was € 10.

The line runs roughly parallel to Gaia bank of the Douro, but there is a significant difference in height between its upper and lower stations, which are respectively some 63 metres (207 ft) and 5 metres (16 ft) above mean sea level. The line is some 562 metres (1,844 ft) long and is supported on 3 pylons. The longest span between the support towers is 396 metres (1,299 ft) and the average incline is 9.1%.

There are 12 cars, each of which can carry up to 8 passengers. The line has a maximum speed of 5 metres per second (16 ft/s), but normally operates at just 2.5 metres per second (8.2 ft/s) in order to allow passengers to enjoy the views of Vila Nova de Gaia, the Douro river, and Porto. Travel time is 3 minutes 45 seconds, and the line can carry up to 850 passengers per hour.

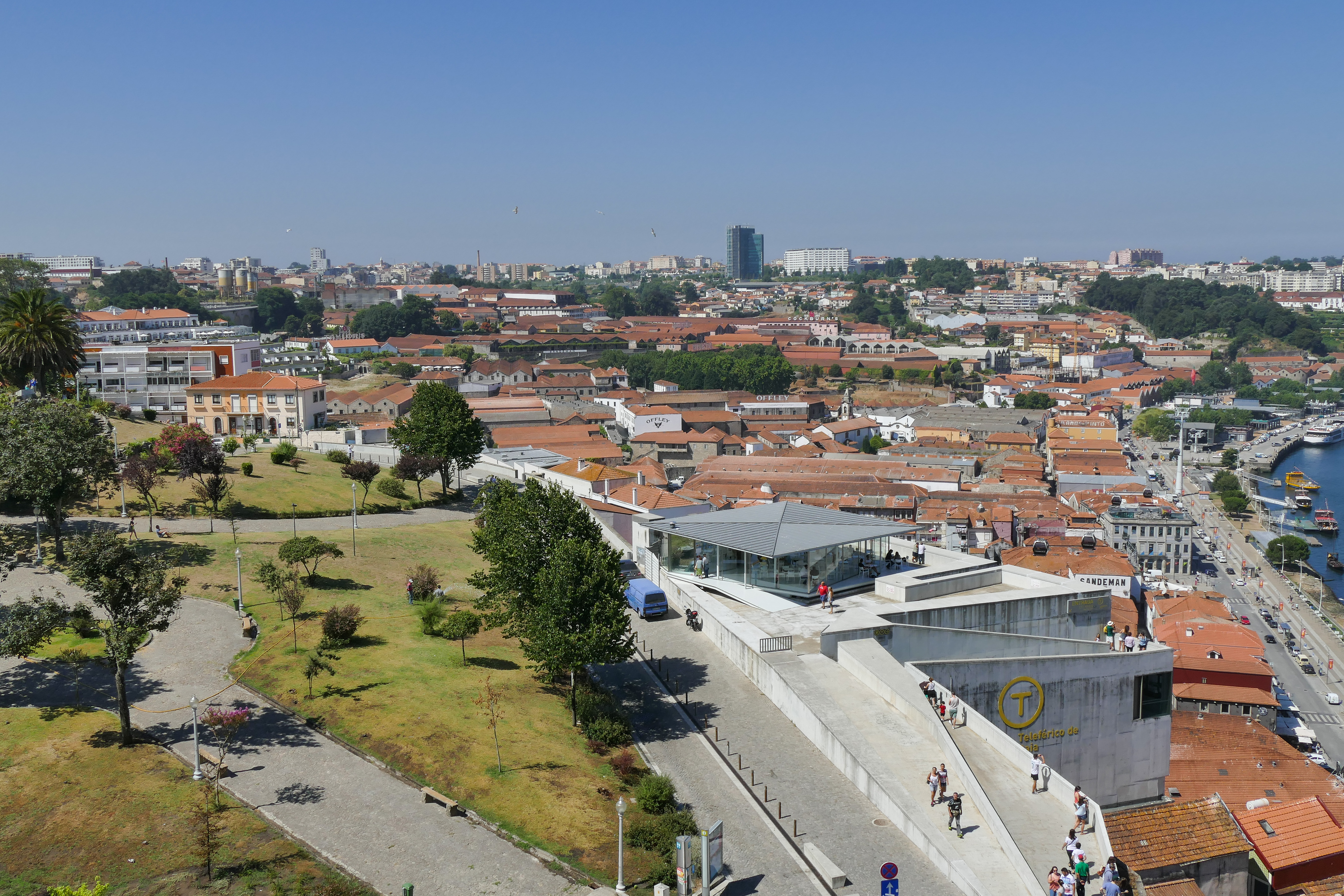
The upper station seen from Serra do Pilar, with the line and lower station in distance

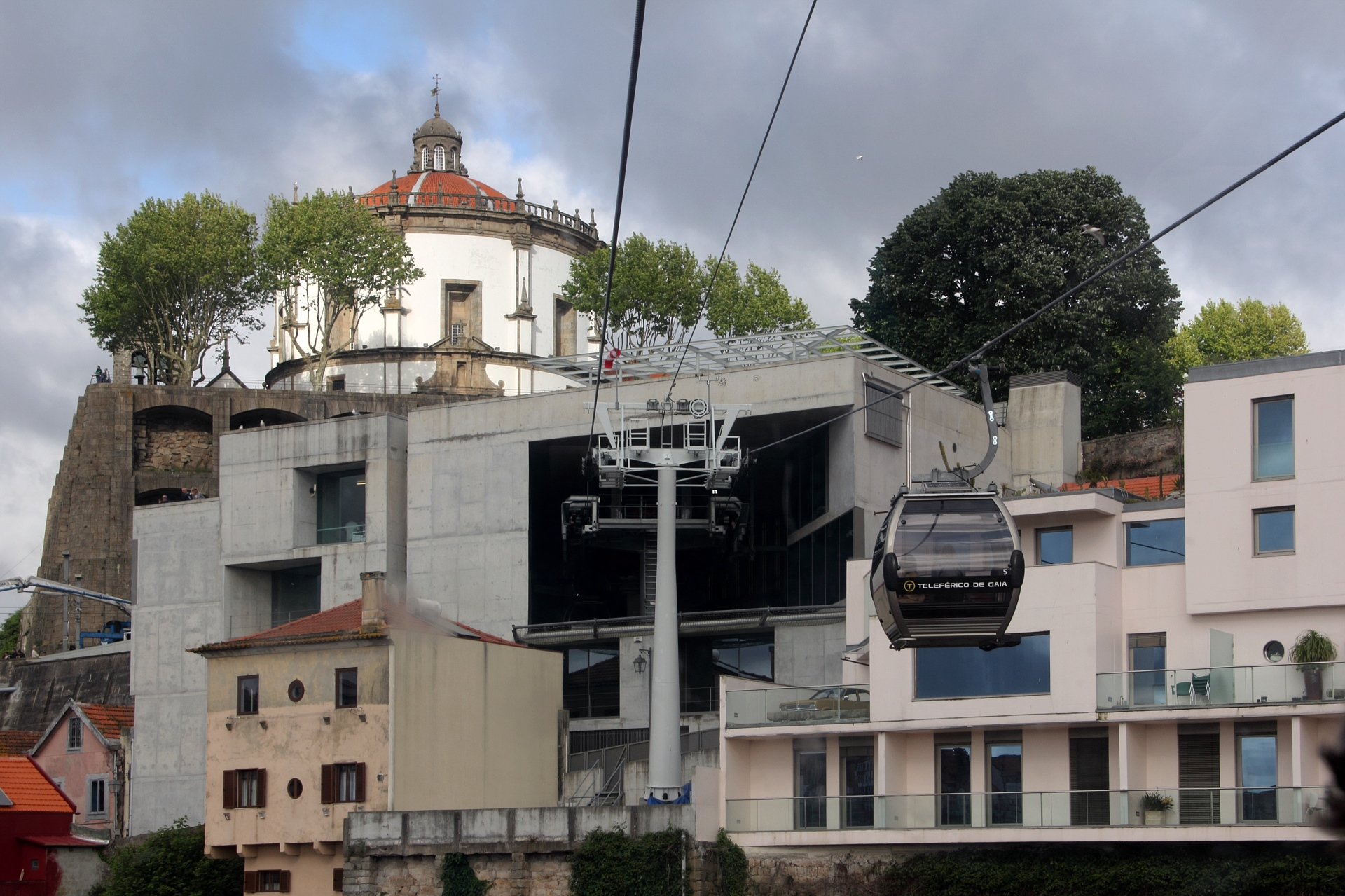
The upper station seen from below, with the Serra do Pilar church above it

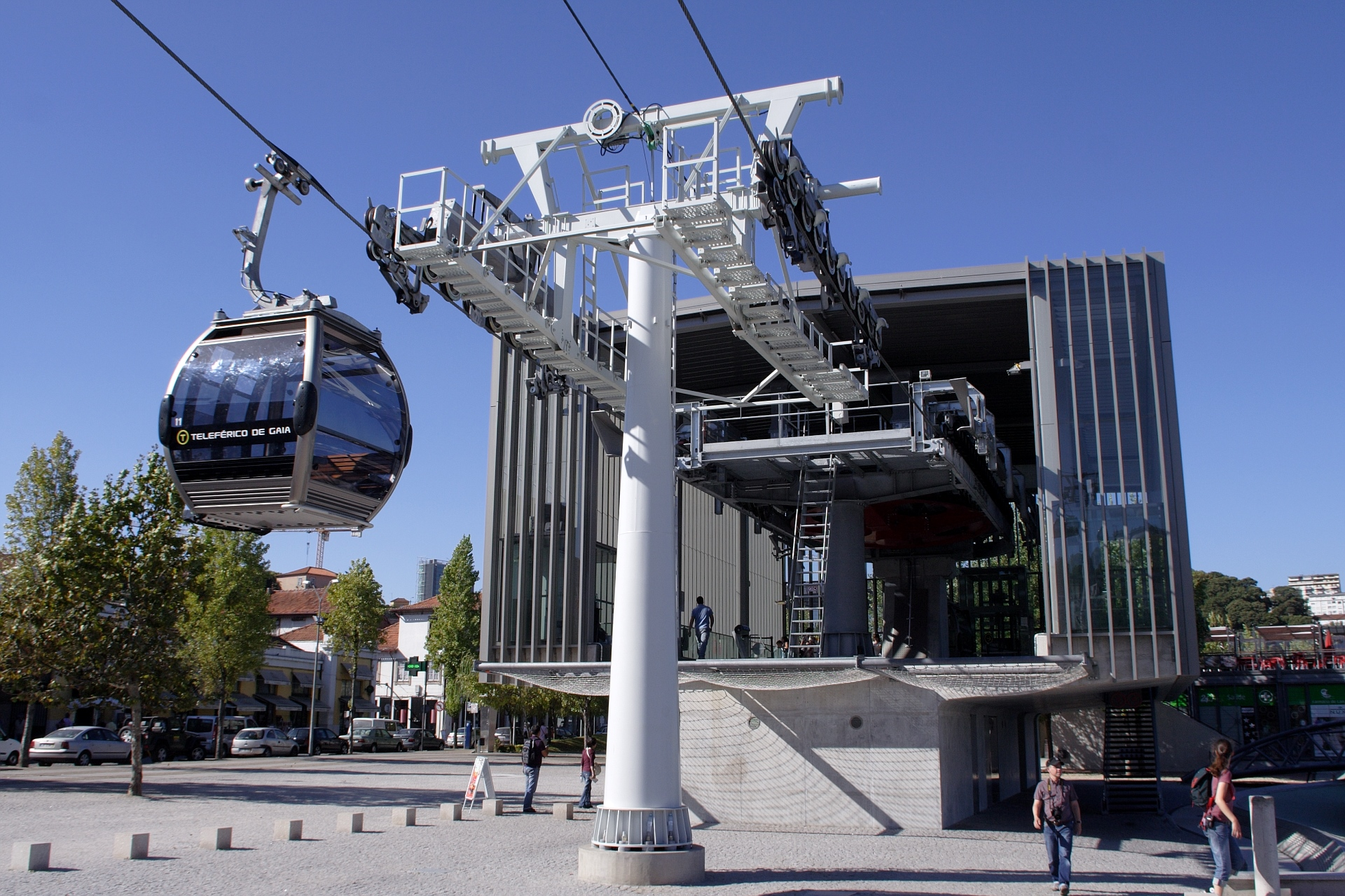
The lower station seen the Douro waterfront

== See also ==
- List of gondola lifts
- Tourism in Vila Nova de Gaia
