= IPO (disambiguation) =

IPO, or initial public offering, a type of securities offering in which a private company goes public.

IPO or ipo may also refer to:

- Immersion pulmonary oedema, a malady of swimmers and divers
- Intellectual Property Office (disambiguation), a government agency in many nations
- Intellectual Property Organisation of Pakistan
- Intellectual Property Owners Association
- International Philosophy Olympiad
- International Progress Organization, a Vienna-based think tank dealing with world affairs
- Interdecadal Pacific oscillation, an oceanographic/meteorological phenomenon
- Internationale Prüfungsordnung (IPO), an international dog sport, also known as Schutzhund
- Instituto Português de Oncologia, Portugal
- IPO station, a metro station at the University of Porto, Portugal
- Israel Philharmonic Orchestra
- IPO model (input-process-output), a conceptual model of computer systems
- Interprocedural optimization, a computer program optimization method
- Independent Party of Oregon
- International Police Organization
- Ipiko language (ISO 639-3 code: ipo)
