= Câmara de Gaia station =

Light rail station on the Porto Metro in Vila Nova de Gaia, Portugal

Câmara de Gaia
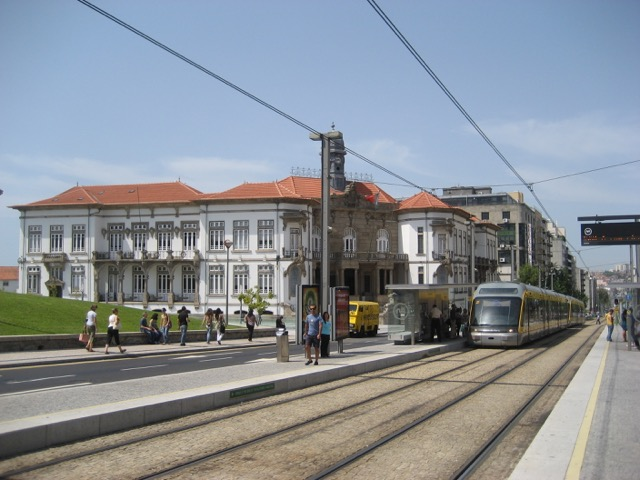
- The station looking north, with Gaia City Hall to the left

General information
- Location: Vila Nova de Gaia; Portugal
- Coordinates: 41°7′46.99″N 8°36′22.50″W
- System: Porto Metro station
- Platforms: 2 side platforms
- Tracks: 2

Construction
- Structure type: At grade
- Accessible: Yes

History
- Opened: 17 September 2005

Services
Preceding station	Porto Metro	Following station
General Torres towards Hospital de São João	Line D	João de Deus towards Vila d'Este
Location

Câmara de Gaia is a light rail station on line D of the Porto Metro system in the municipality of Vila Nova de Gaia, Portugal. It is situated on the Avenida da República adjacent to the Gaia City Hall, from which it takes its name.

The initial section of line D, including Câmara de Gaia station, opened on 17 September 2005, with trains initially running to Pólo Universitário to the north. Câmara de Gaia was the southern terminus until 27 May 2008, when the line was extended to D. João II. The line has since been extended from D. João II to Vila d’Este, and from Pólo Universitário to Hospital de São João.

The station is preceded by General Torres and followed by João de Deus stations. On weekdays, trains run every five to six minutes, declining to every 10 minutes on weekends and evenings. The station platforms are on the surface, and there are two through tracks, each served by a side platform. The platforms are directly accessible from the Avenida da República.
