= Monastery of Serra do Pilar =

- Mosteiro da Serra do Pilar (Portuguese)
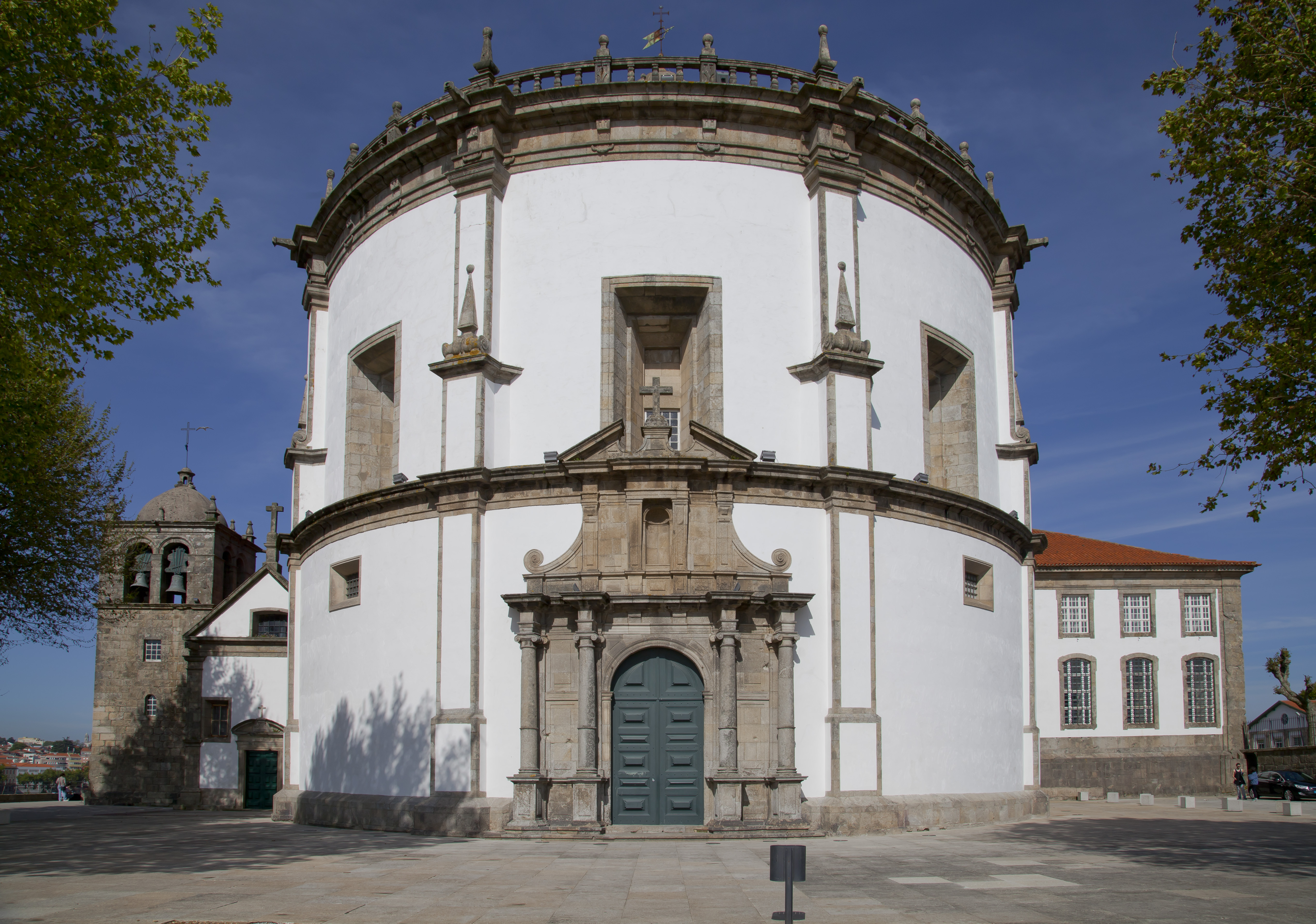
- West entrance to the monastery's church

- Location within Portugal
- 41°8′18″N 8°36′27″W
- Type: Monastery
- Location: Vila Nova de Gaia, Portugal

History
- Built: 1672

Site notes
- Architectural styles: Renaissance; Mannerist

UNESCO World Heritage Site
- Criteria: Cultural: (iv)
- Designated: 1996 (20th session)
- Part of: Historic Centre of Porto, Luiz I Bridge and Monastery of Serra do Pilar
- Reference no.: 755

Portuguese National Monument
- Type: Non-movable
- Criteria: National Monument
- Designated: 16 June 1910
- Reference no.: IPA.00005358

The Monastery of Serra do Pilar is a former monastery located in Vila Nova de Gaia, Portugal, on the opposite side of the Douro River from Porto. The monastery is situated on an outcrop overlooking the Dom Luís I Bridge and the historic centre of Porto. Together with these locations, the monastery was designated a UNESCO World Heritage Site in 1996. The monastery is notable for its church and cloister, both of which are circular.

== Site ==
The Monastery of Serra do Pilar is located in the parish of Santa Marinha e São Pedro da Afurada in the historic centre of Vila Nova de Gaia. The monastery is prominently situated high above the Doura and can be accessed by Jardim do Morro Station on the Porto Metro's D Line, and by the Gaia Cable Car from the riverside of Vila Nova de Gaia.

== History ==
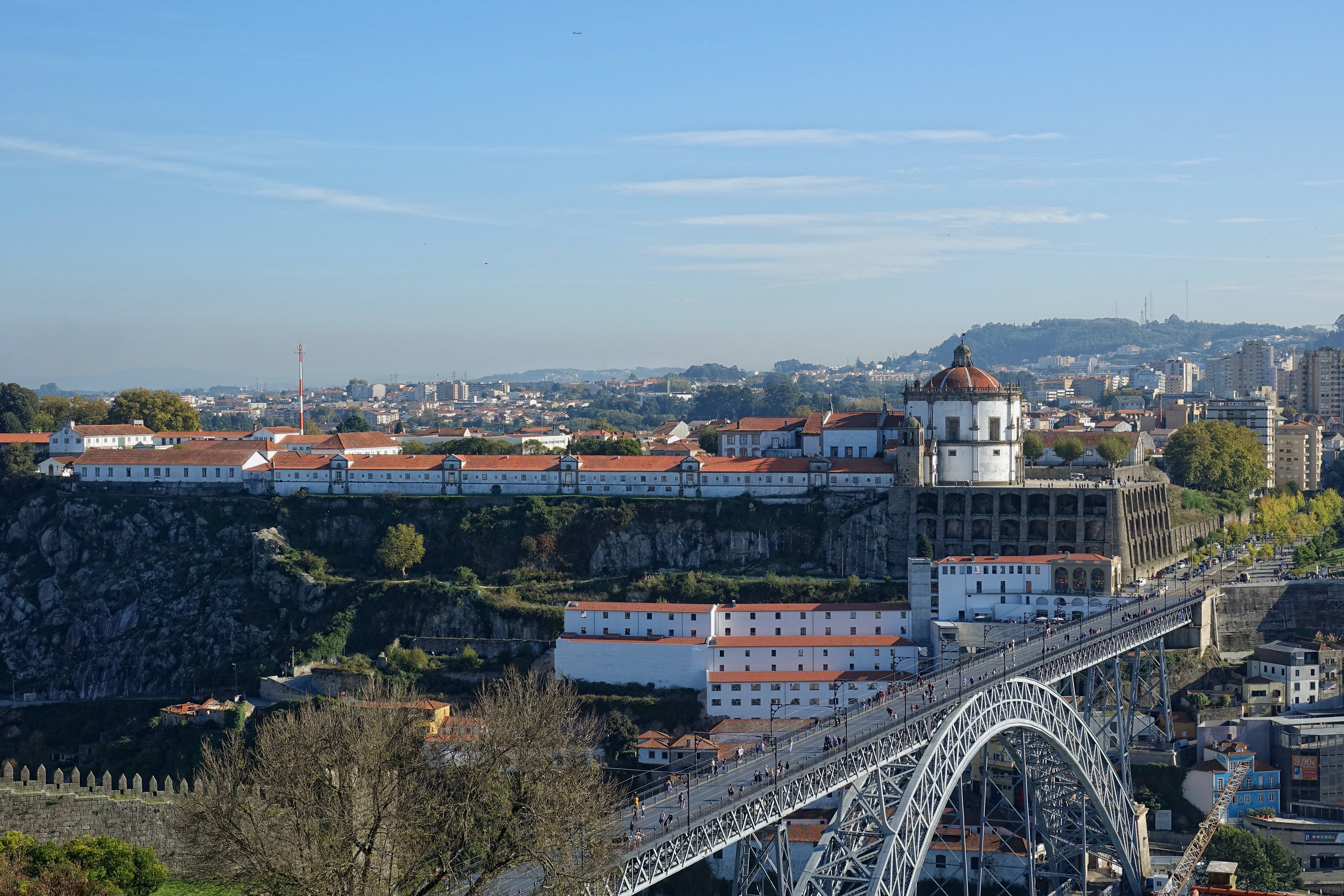
View of the former monastery from Porto

Construction of the first monastery at the site began in 1538 by the Order of St. Augustine. The initiative dates back to 1527 under the orders of João III to serve as a larger monastic residence for monks from the Monastery of Grijó, in Grijó, which had been in a state of deterioration. The original monastery was completed in 1564 and the cloisters were finished in 1583. The first monastery was quickly rendered obsolete as the facilities were too small for the number of monks in residence. In 1597, work began on the new church and the monastery was slowly updated in phases over the next several decades. The new circular church was inaugurated on July 17, 1672, and the final phases of the monastery were completed by the end of the 17th century.

Serra do Pilar's military importance first became evidenced during the Peninsular War when it was used by General Arthur Wellesley to launch a surprise attack on the French across the Douro, and retake Porto. The monastery's prominent location acted as the only Liberal stronghold on the south side of the Douro during the Siege of Porto. The monastery was fortified over the course of the 19th century to take advantage of its strategic location. In 1910 the site was declared a National Monument of Portugal. Reconstruction of portions of the monastery that had been destroyed by successive wars began in 1927. In 1947 some of the monastery grounds were converted into a military barracks which remains on the site to this day. Since the late 20th century the monastery and grounds have been open to the public and the church continues to hold Sunday Mass. The monastery was included in the 1996 UNESCO World Heritage Site designation of Porto's historic centre.

== Architecture ==
The Monastery of Serra do Pilar's unique design is influenced by Renaissance and Mannerist elements. The church and cloister are both circular with identical diameters. The church in the west and the cloister in the east are separated by a rectangular choir and chapel. The north wing of the monastery houses the bell tower and dormitories and the south wing houses the sacristy and refectory.

The 36 m (118 ft)-tall church is the most visible structure of the monastery, dominating the skyline on the south side of the Douro and towering over the 20 m (66 ft)-tall bell tower. The Church of Serra do Pilar is one of a number of round churches in Western Europe.

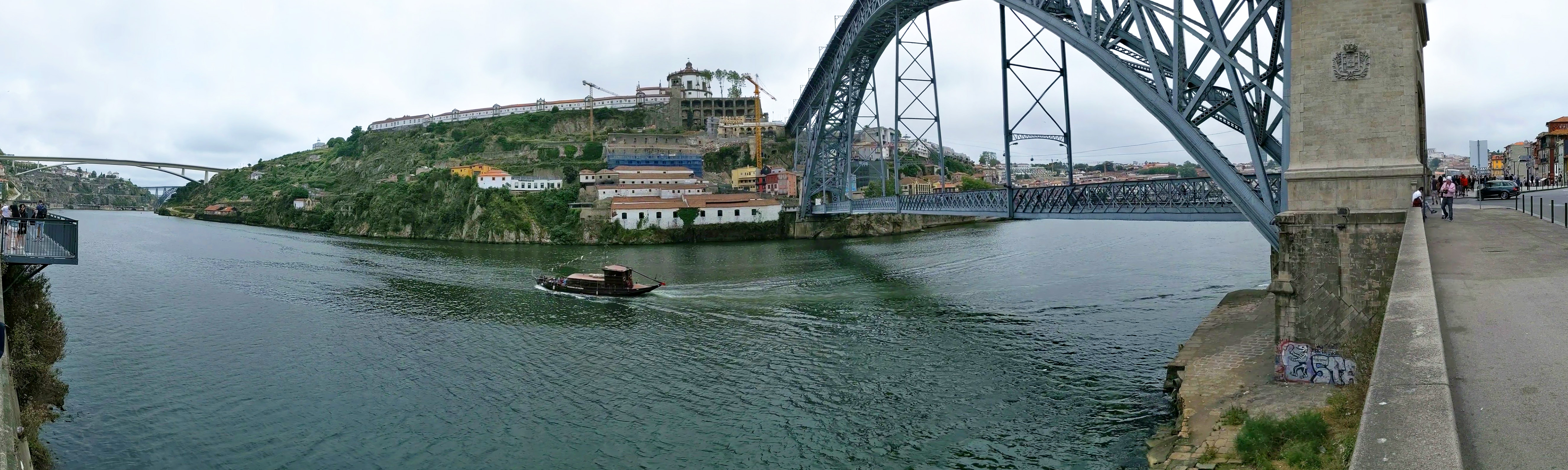
Panoramic view from Porto under the Dom Luís I Bridge

== Gallery ==
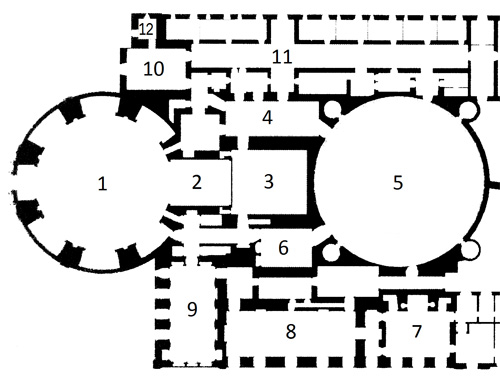
Layout showing the church (1) and cloister (5)

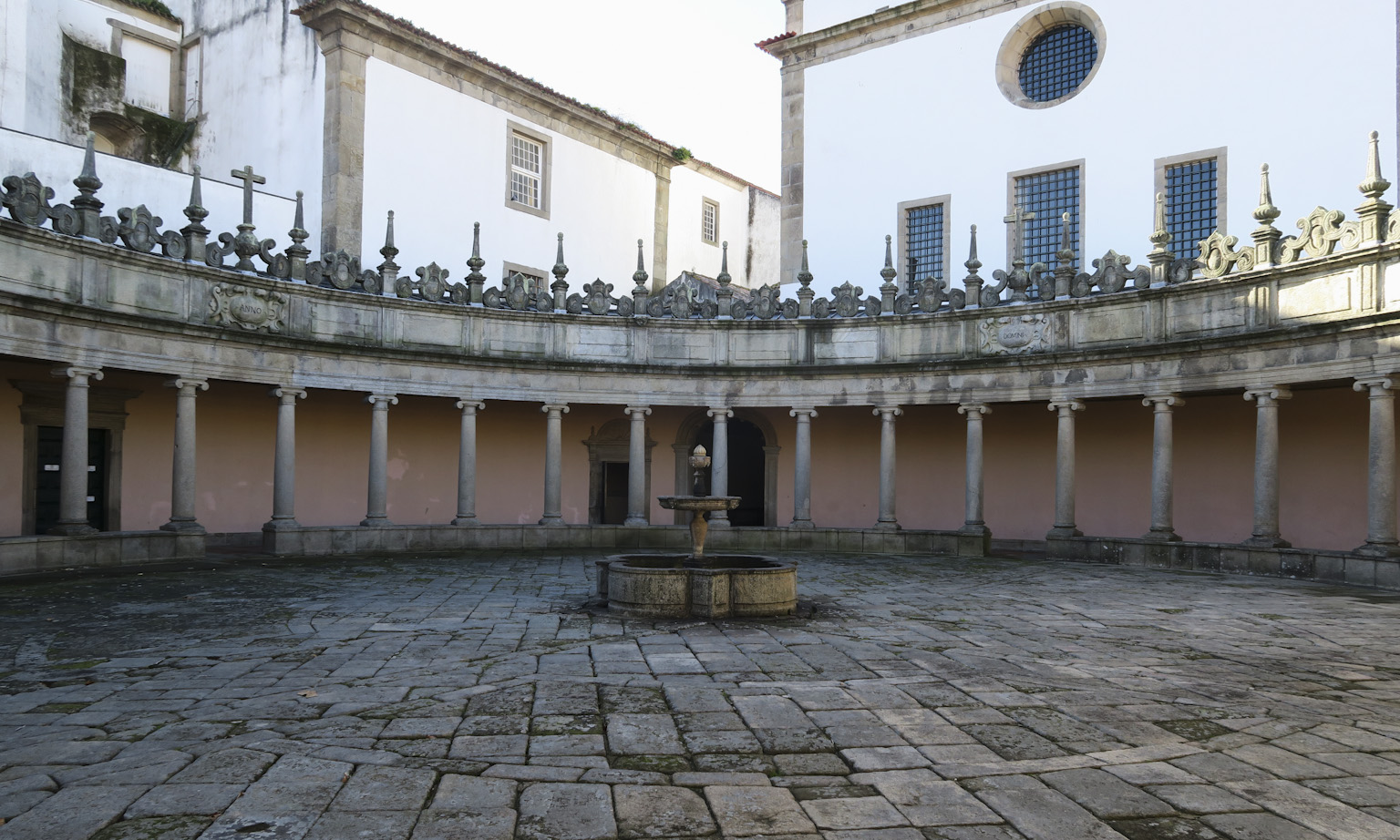
The circular cloister

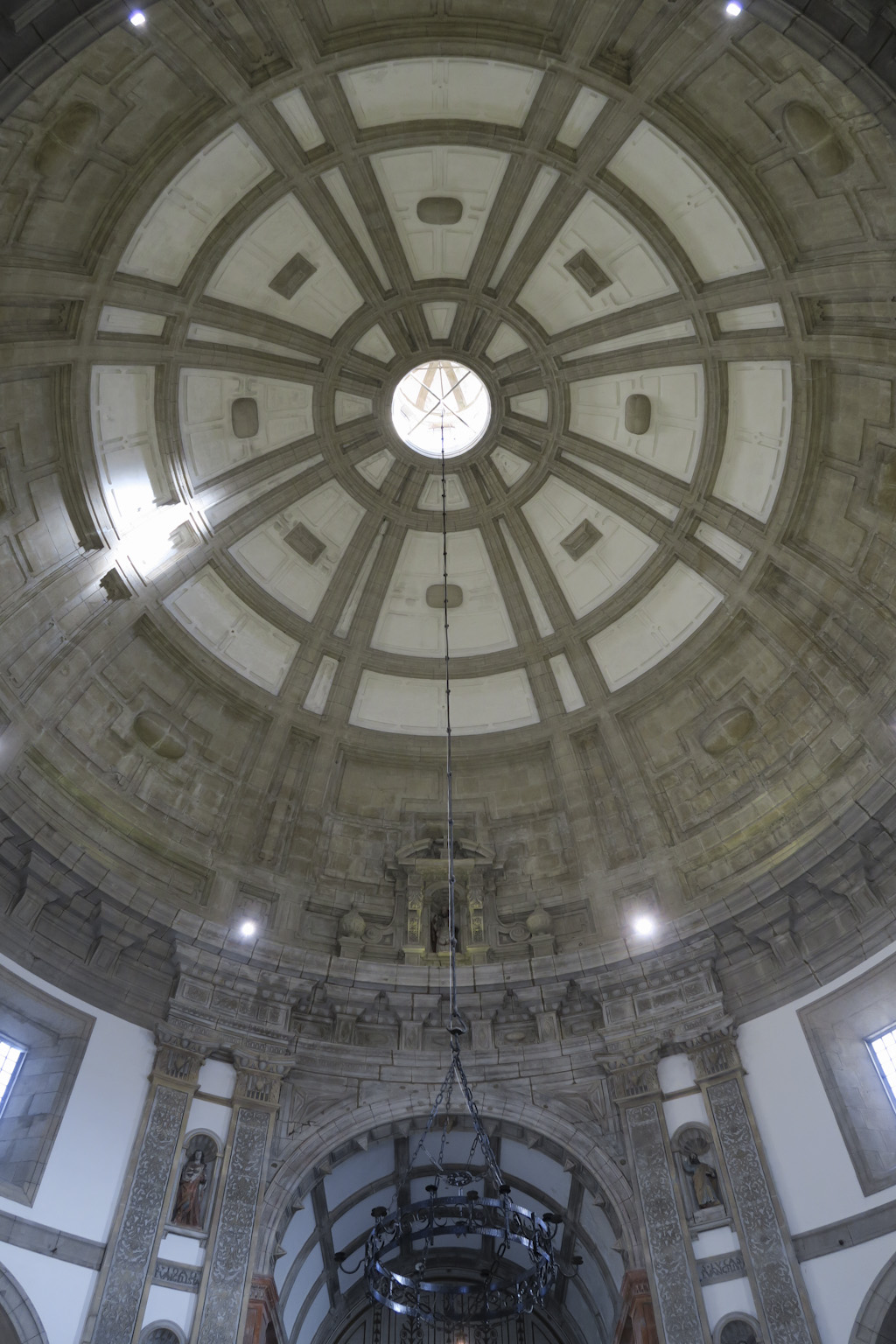
View inside the church's dome

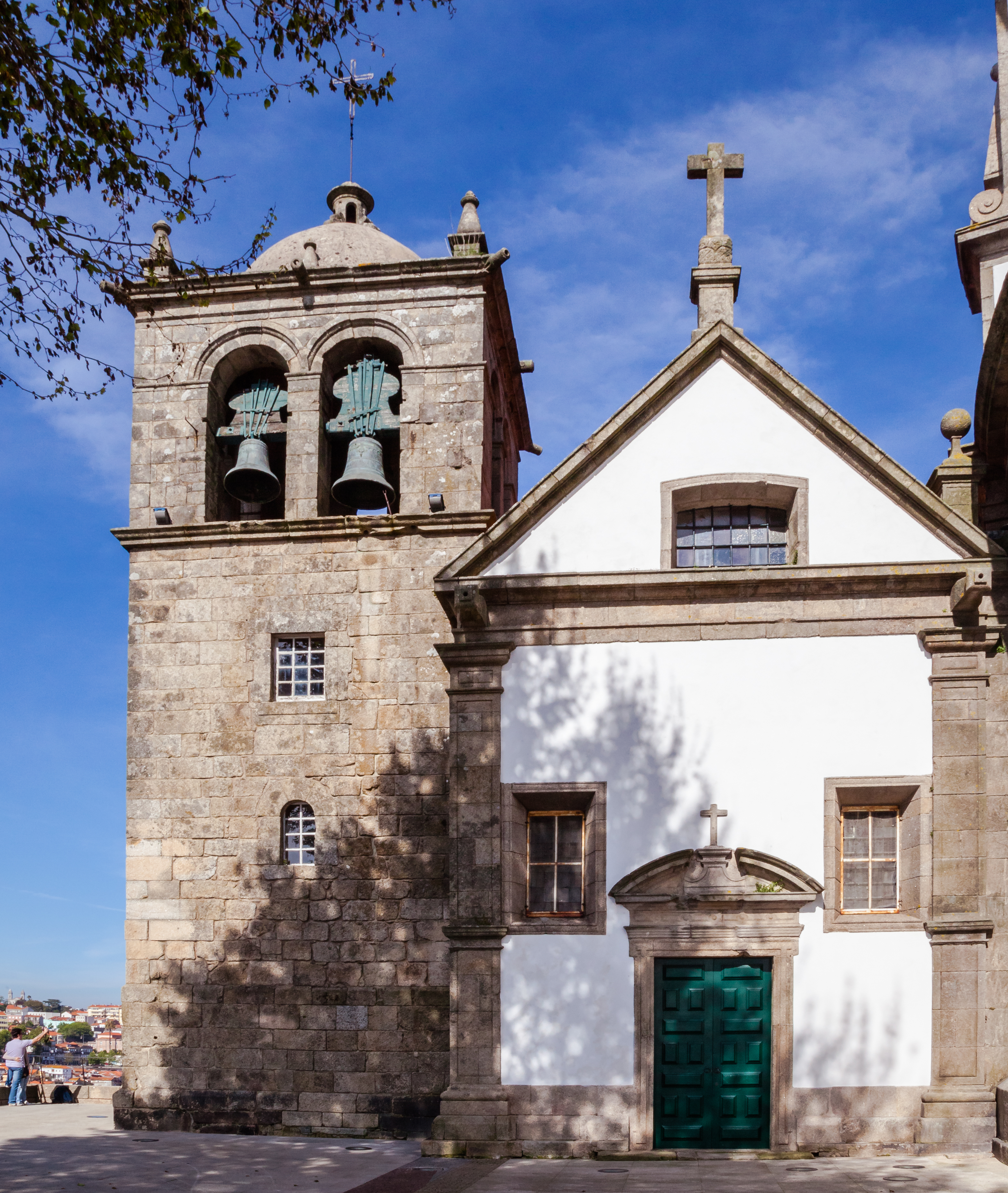
The bell tower and main entrance

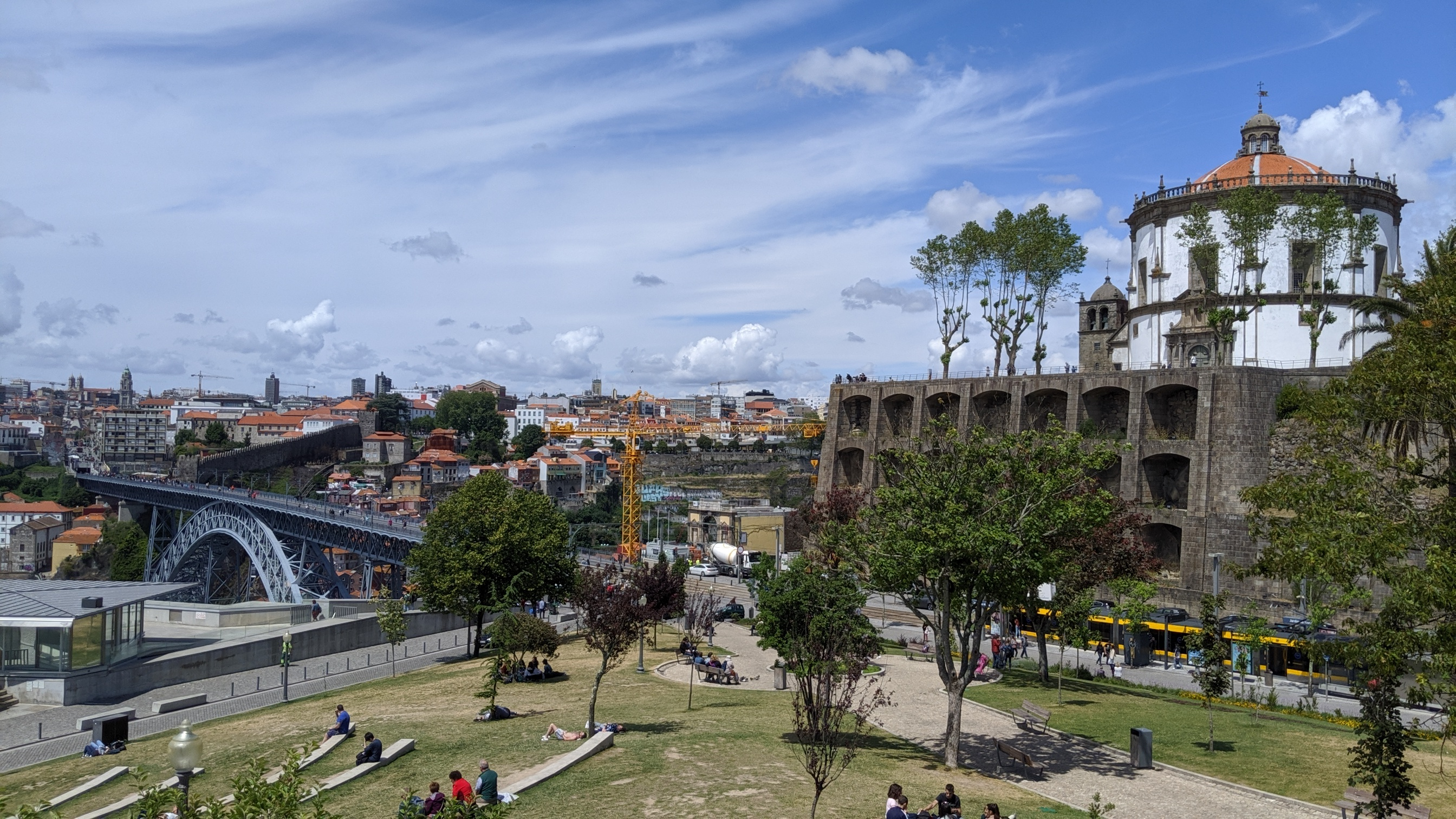
View from Jardim do Morro

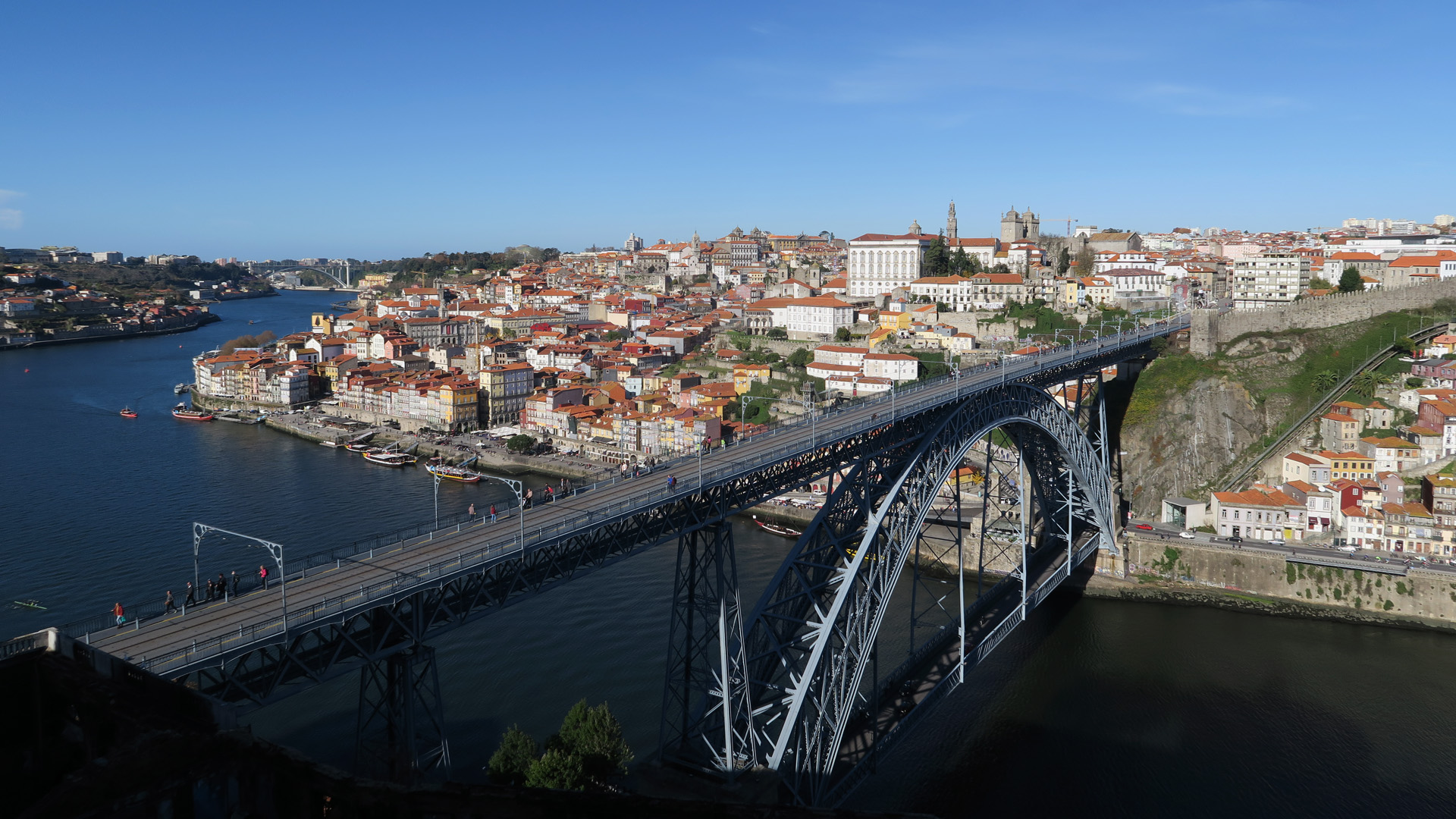
View of Porto from the monastery
