= Dom Luís I Bridge =

Bridge in Porto, Portugal

Dom Luís I Bridge Ponte Luiz I
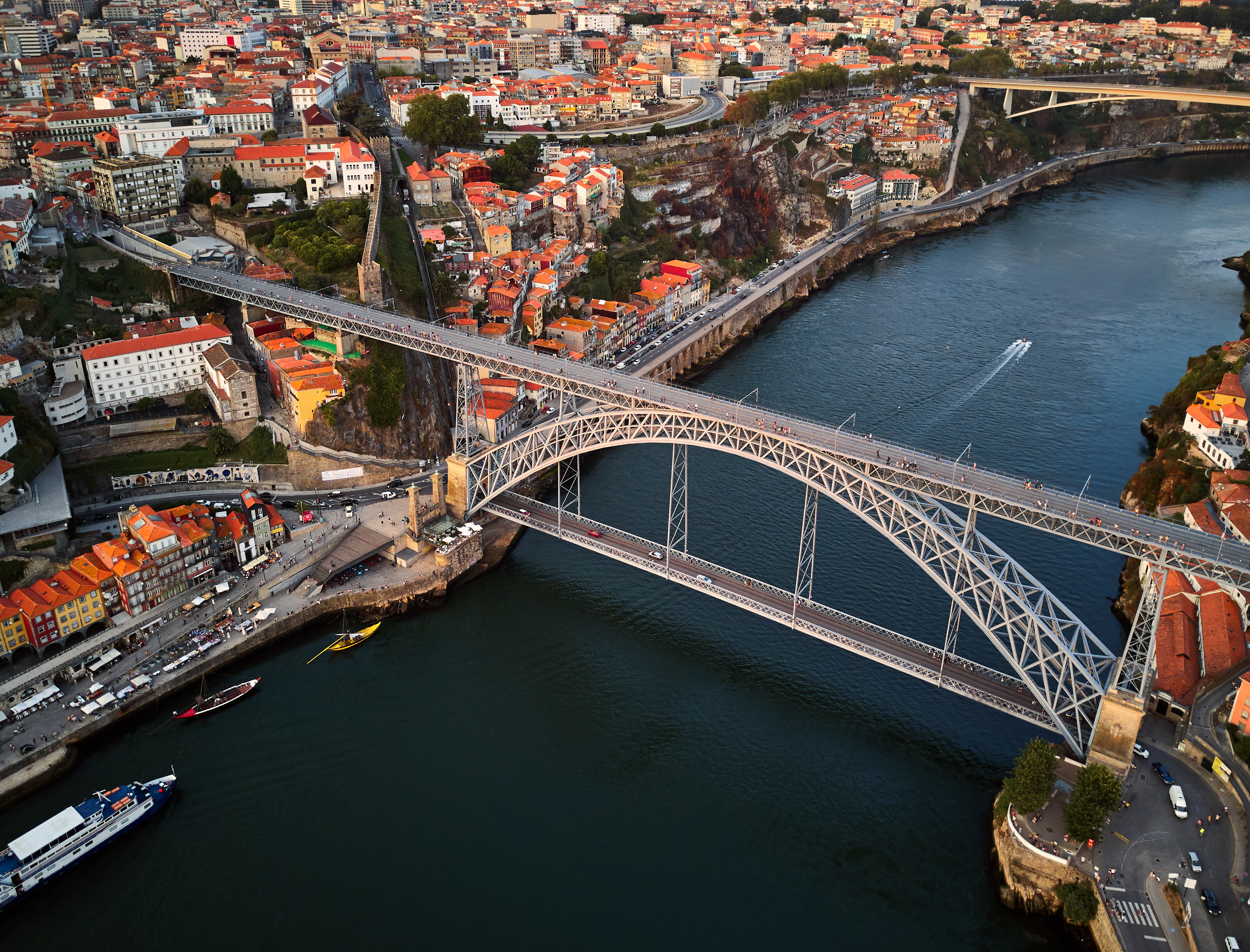
- Aerial view of the Luiz I Bridge
- Coordinates: 41.139863°N 8.609336°W
- Carries: Light rail line and pedestrians (upper deck); Public transport and pedestrians (lower deck)
- Crosses: Rio Douro
- Locale: Porto, between the City of Porto proper and Vila Nova de Gaia
- Official name: Ponte Luiz I
- Other name: Ponte de Dom Luís I
- Named for: Luís I of Portugal
- Preceded by: Ponte Pênsil

Characteristics
- Design: Two-hinged double-deck arch bridge
- Material: Iron
- Trough construction: Granite
- Pier construction: Asphalt
- Total length: Two decks of varying lengths: 172 metres (564 ft) (lower deck) and 395.25 metres (1,296.8 ft)
- Width: 8 metres (26 ft) vehicular width (between pedestrian walkways)
- Height: 70 metres (230 ft)
- Longest span: 395.25 metres (1,296.8 ft)

Rail characteristics
- No. of tracks: 2
- Track gauge: 1.45

History
- Designer: Théophile Seyrig
- Constructed by: Société de Willebroek
- Construction start: 21 November 1881
- Construction end: 30 October 1886
- Construction cost: 369,000$00 réis
- Inaugurated: 31 October 1886

Statistics
- Toll: 1 November 1886–1 January 1944

UNESCO World Heritage Site
- Part of: Historic Centre of Porto, Luiz I Bridge and Monastery of Serra do Pilar
- Criteria: Cultural: (iv)
- Reference: 755
- Inscription: 1996 (20th Session)

Portuguese National Monument
- Type: Non-movable
- Criteria: Monument of Public Interest
- Designated: 26 February 1982
- Reference no.: IPA.00005548 / PT011312140057

Location
- Interactive map of Dom Luís I Bridge

The Luiz I Bridge (Portuguese: Ponte Luiz I), commonly known as Dom Luís I Bridge (Ponte de Dom Luís I), is a double-deck metal arch bridge that spans the river Douro between the cities of Porto and Vila Nova de Gaia in Portugal. At its construction, its 172 metres (564 ft) span was the longest of its type in the world. It can be confused with the nearby Maria Pia Bridge, a railway bridge that was built 9 years earlier (and is located 1 kilometre (0.62 mi) to the east), which is similar in aspect to the Luiz I bridge.

Today, the bridge's upper level is used by pedestrians and by line D of the Porto Metro, whilst buses, taxis, cyclists, and pedestrians use the lower level. The lower level links to the Porto waterfront, including the Praça da Ribeira and the lower station of the Guindais Funicular, at its northern end, and to Gaia waterfront, with its Port wine lodges, at its southern end. The upper level connects to Porto city centre and São Bento station at its northern end, and adjoins the Serra do Pilar Monastery and the upper station of the Gaia Cable Car at its southern end.

== History ==
=== Inception and construction ===
In 1879, Gustave Eiffel presented a project to construct a new bridge over the Douro, with a high single deck in order to facilitate ship navigation. This project was rejected due to dramatic growth of the urban population, which required a rethinking of the limits of a single-deck platform.

A competition was initiated in November 1880, in order to construct a double-deck metal bridge, which included projects by Compagnie de Fives-Lille, Cail & C., Schneider & Co., Gustave Eiffel, Lecoq & Co., Société de Braine-le-Comte, Société des Batignolles (which submitted two ideas), Andrew Handyside & Co., Société de Construction de Willebroek (also two projects), and John Dixon. It was in January of the following year that deliberations by the committee supported the project of Société de Willebroek. This design cost 369,000$00 réis and provided better carrying capacity. On 21 November 1881, the public work was awarded to the Belgian Société de Willebroek, from Brussels, for 402 contos. It was to be administered by Théophile Seyrig, the former partner of Gustave Eiffel and author of the project. Seyrig had also designed the Maria Pia bridge that was constructed by Eiffel & cie, hence the resemblance of his new bridge to the Maria Pia bridge. Construction began on the Luiz I bridge alongside the towers of an earlier suspension bridge, the Ponte Pênsil, which was disassembled.

By 26 May 1886, the first weight experiments began, with the transport of a 2,000 kilograms (4,400 lb) per metre. On 30 October, construction of the main arch and upper deck was concluded, resulting in its inauguration the very next day. On 1 November, a toll system began to operate under the administration of the winning company, which was equal to 4 reís per person. The following year, the lower deck was inaugurated, completing the project. During its ceremonies, the bridge was blessed by Bishop D. Américo.

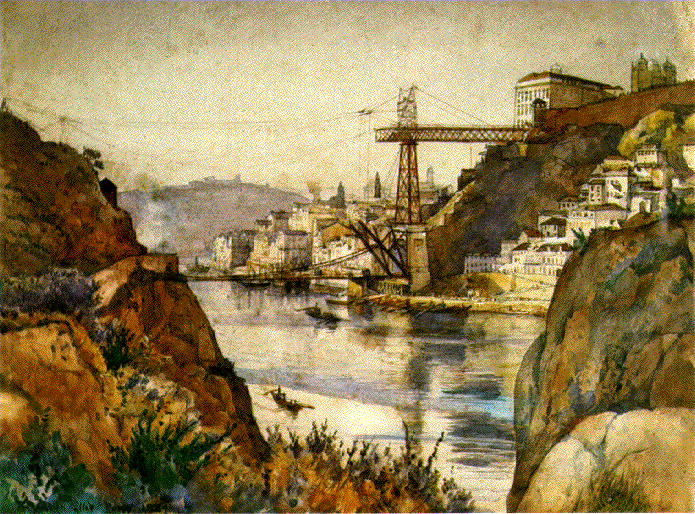
A view of the initial construction of Luiz I Bridge from the river Douro's mouth (1881–1886)

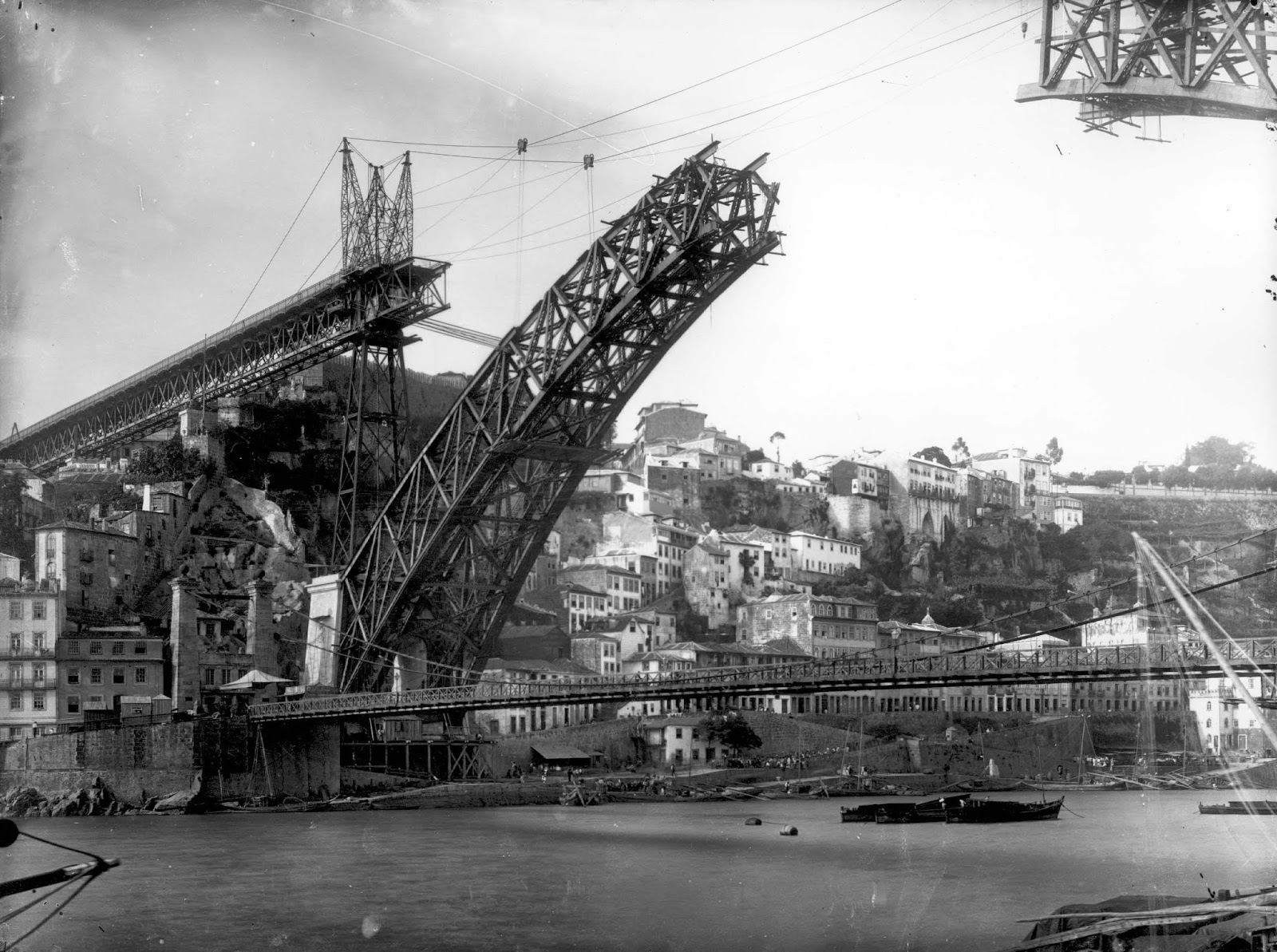
An 1883 view of Ponte Pênsil and Luiz I, showing the construction of the archway

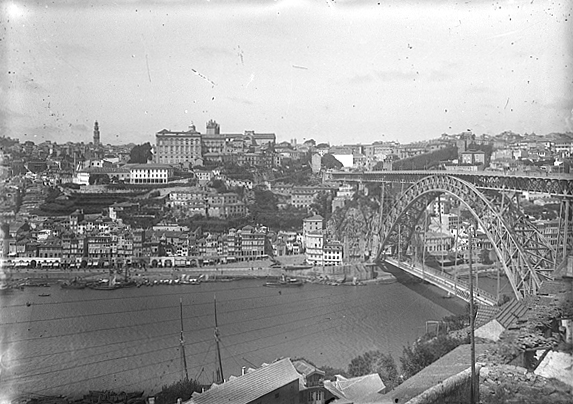
A turn of the century perspective of the bridge, taken northward from Vila Nova de Gaia

=== 20th and 21st centuries ===
By the turn of the century (1908) electric carriages were installed in the city centre, extending to the bridge.

On 1 January 1944, the toll system was discontinued, and the bridge began to function as a free infrastructure of the municipal authority of Porto. Originally and for more than a century, the bridge carried road traffic on both decks. Along with other vehicles, electric trams crossed the upper deck from 1908 until May 1959, and trolleybuses crossed both decks from May 1959 until 1993. By 1954, public works were initiated on the bridge under the direction of engineer Edgar Cardoso, who extended the decks and removed the electrification of the deck.

In 1982, the bridge was designated a cultural heritage Imóvel de Interesse Público (Property of Public Interest) by national agency IGESPAR, the Portuguese Institute for the Management of Architectural and Archaeological Heritage.

On 27 June 2003, the upper deck was closed to motor traffic in order to adapt the structure for the metro system. Infante Dom Henrique Bridge, 500 m (1,600 ft) upriver, was completed three months earlier to provide an alternative vehicle connection between Porto and Vila Nova de Gaia. The new "D Line" was inaugurated on 18 September 2005, and opened to the metro trams and pedestrian traffic. With more traffic and demographic growth, in March 2006, a project to enlarge the lower deck was elaborated by architect Virgínio Moutinho and engineers António and José António Campos e Matos. However, the municipal council of Porto asked the Direção-Geral do Património Cultural (Directorate-General for Cultural Patrimony) to avoid a decision on the project, as it was being rethought.

The lower deck remained open to general traffic until October 2021, when it closed temporarily to all traffic for the start of repairs and renovation work predicted to last about one year. When it reopened, in April 2023, the lower deck was restricted to public transport, taxis, cyclists and pedestrians.

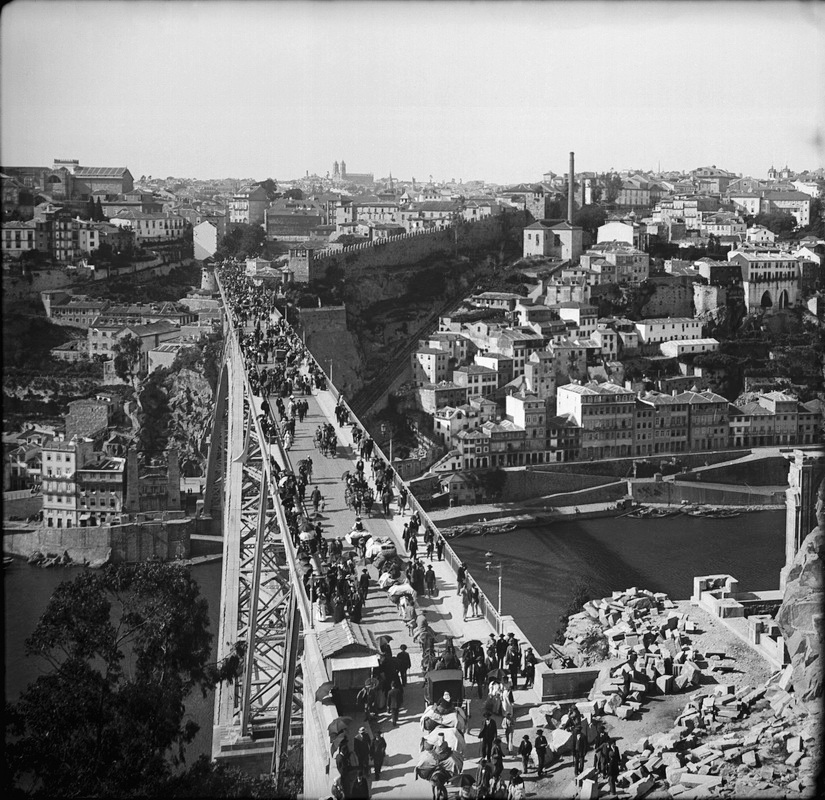
The upper deck c.1930

The bridge in 1983 with the upper deck open to general traffic

Porto Metro tram on the upper deck in 2008

== Architecture ==
The bridge is situated in an isolated, urban area over the River Douro between the granite banks, where the Cathedral of Porto and the escarpment of the Serra do Pilar form a box valley. It is 1 kilometre (0.62 mi) from the bridge of D. Maria Pia and, farther along, the Arrábida Bridge. On the Porto side, the lower deck connects the Cais da Ribeira and the upper Avenida Vímara Peres, while the bank of Vila Nova de Gaia to the Avenida Diogo Leite and Avenida da República, respectively. Access to the Porto side is located along the Pillars of Ponte Pênsil. At the same time, the Guindais Funicular, the Church and Shelter of Ferro, the Fernandina Walls, and the Monastery of Serra do Pilar.

The iron bridge has two decks, of differing heights and widths, between which develops a large 172.5 metres (566 ft) diameter, central arch supporting these upper and lower decks. Both decks are moored to the riverbanks by means of masonry piers. Those in the upper deck are rectangular with a trimmed cornice finish, consisting of two staggered registers separated by cornice and interlacing struts. The lower deck is based on large foundations supporting molded cornices and wedges linked together by a felled arch, and framed by interlacing beams. At the base of the arches, facing the riverbanks, are large marble plaques with inscriptions "PONTE LUIZ I", and on the upstream face are stones representing royal coat-of-arms, with a shield framed by garlands. At the base of the lower deck, are iron-pillared, pyramidal-truncated pillars, erected in three sections, that attach to the upper deck.

The bridge has an asphalt pavement for vehicular traffic, separated by cast iron guards, which limit the pedestrian sidewalks, which develop laterally. The central arch emerges from the bollards at the foundations and decreases in thickness towards the center. The upper deck, also flanked by pedestrian walkways protected by cast iron guards (similar to the lower deck), was also asphalt-paved until converted to carry light rail trains of the Porto Metro in the mid-2000s. From this deck are lamps used for illumination, confronting and connected, forming decorative circles at the angles. Under the guard is a cut-out-like lambrequin decorated with phytomorphic elements.

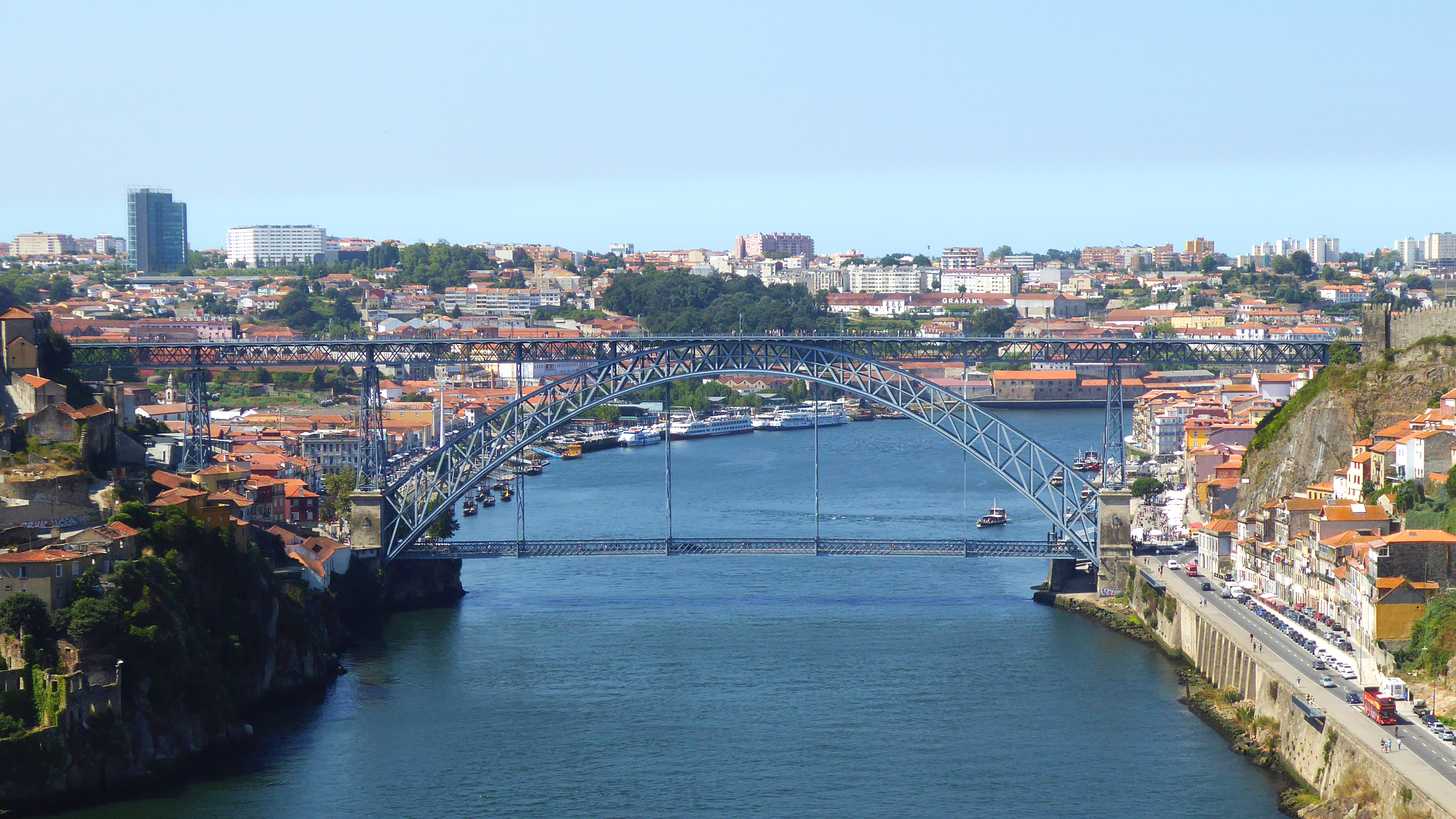
Luís I Bridge over the river Douro, connecting Porto and Vila Nova de Gaia, in the parish of Santa Marinha e São Pedro da Afurada

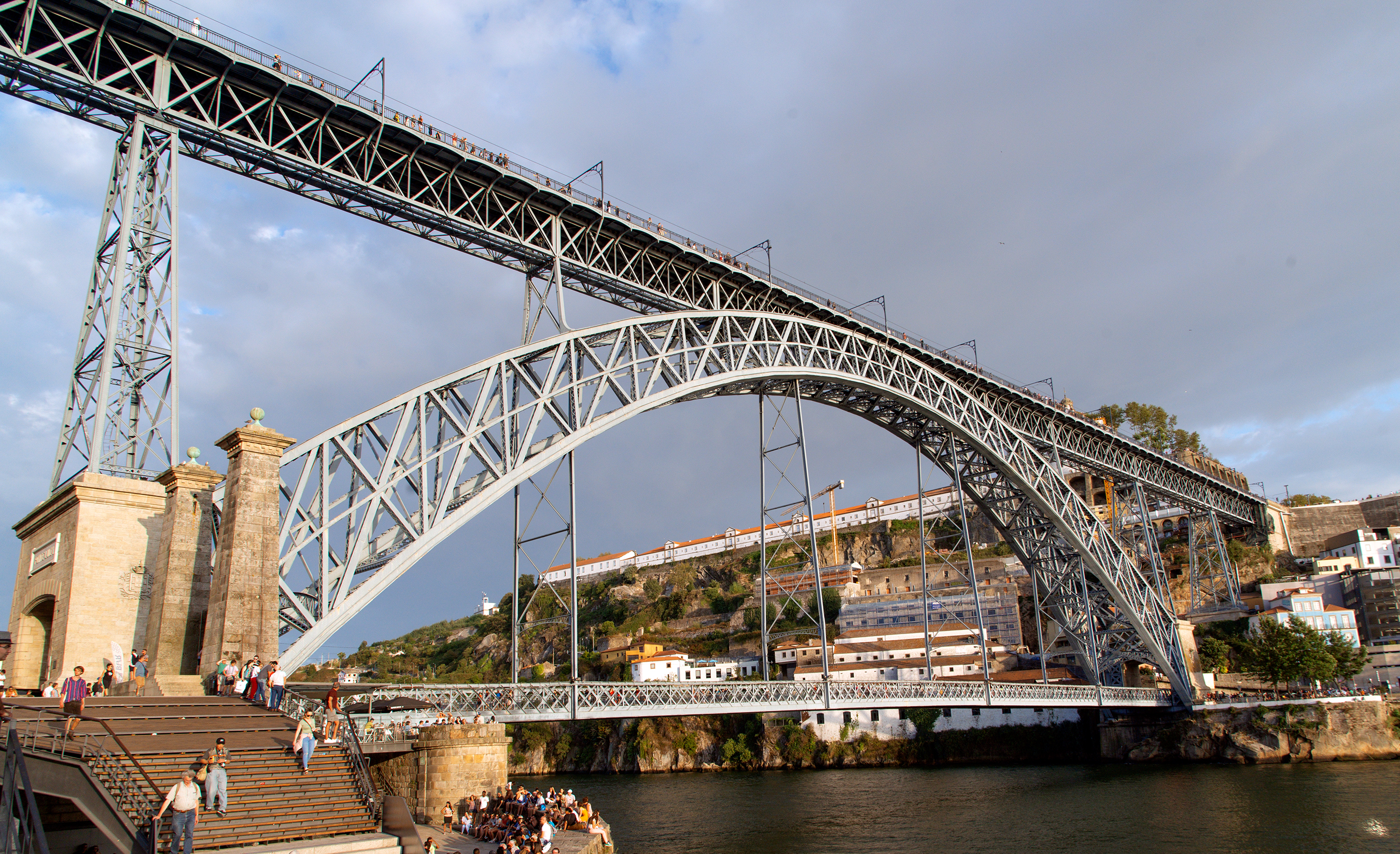
The decks and archway are emblematic of Luís I Bridge.

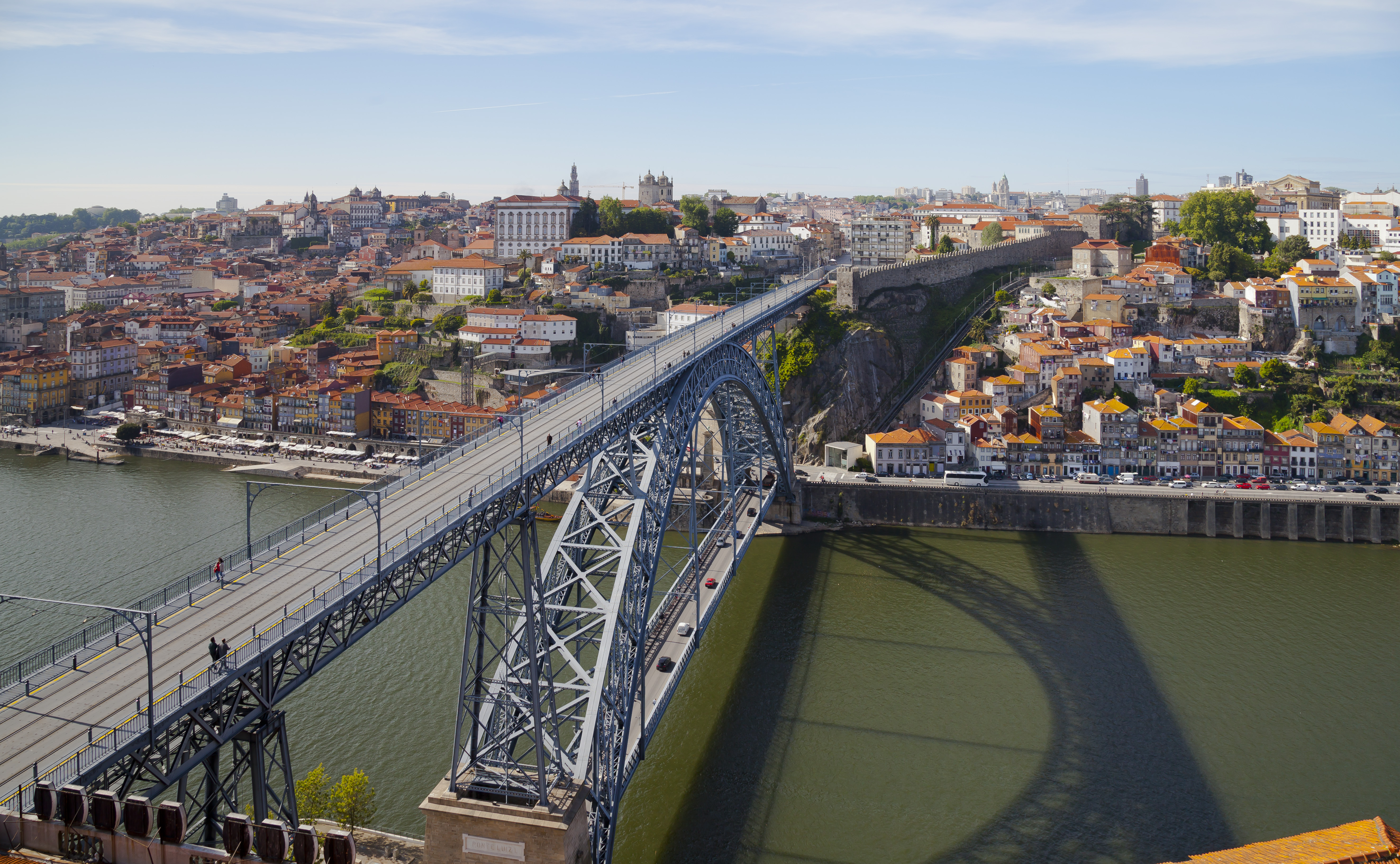
A view of the bridge towards Porto from the southern margin of Vila Nova de Gaia

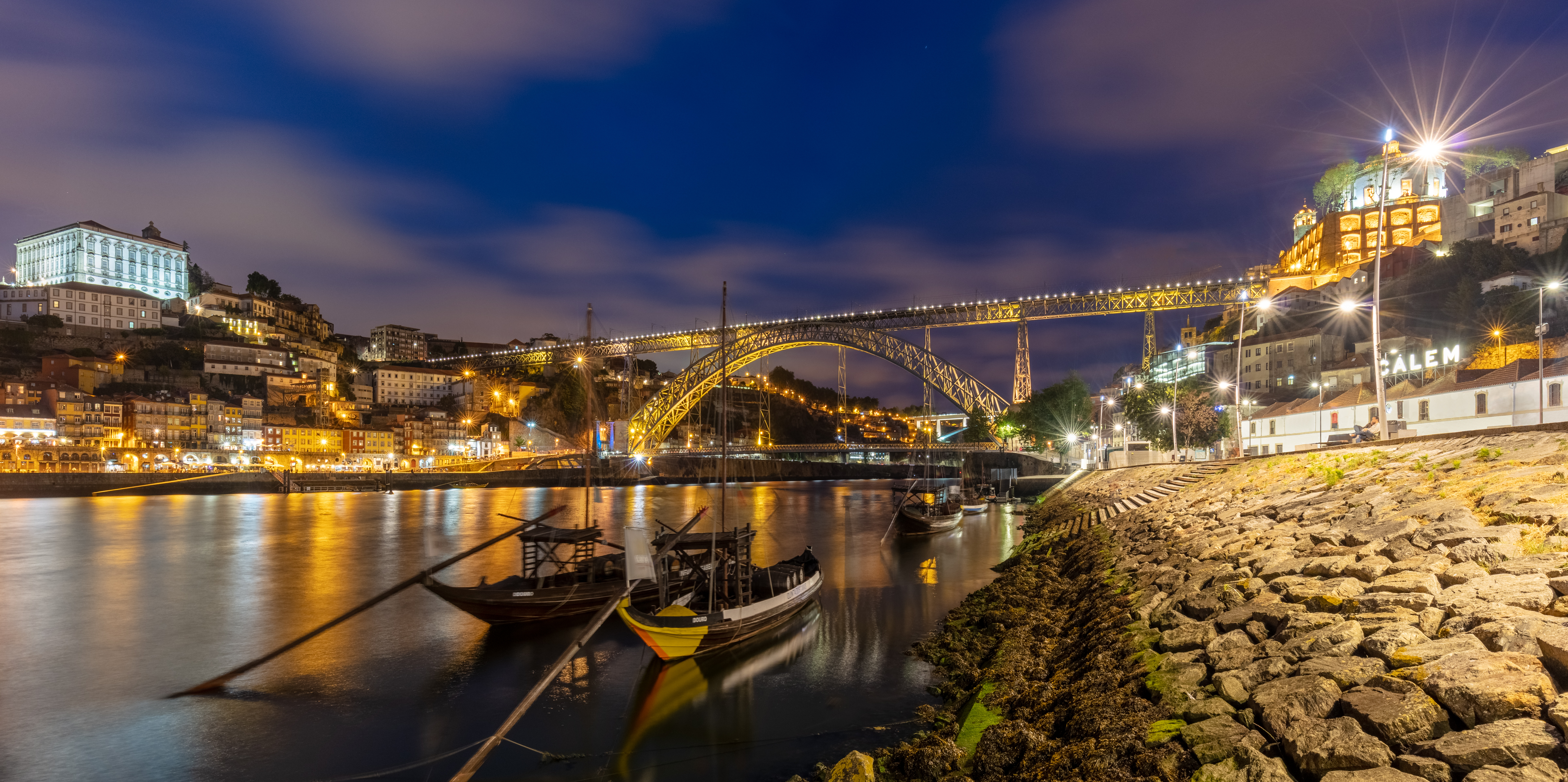
Night view of the bridge showing the historic centre of Porto and main archway

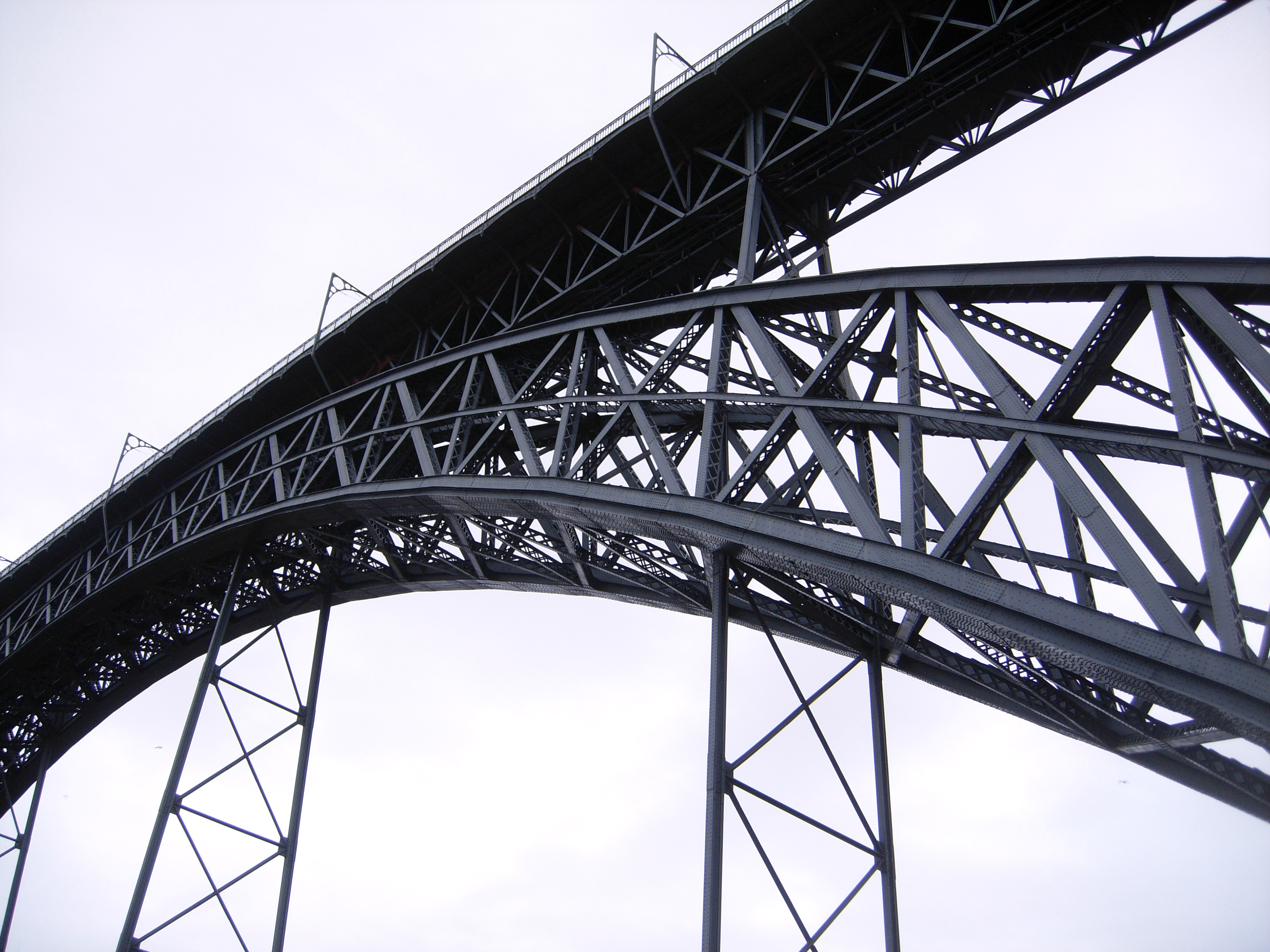
Silhouette of Luís I Bridge

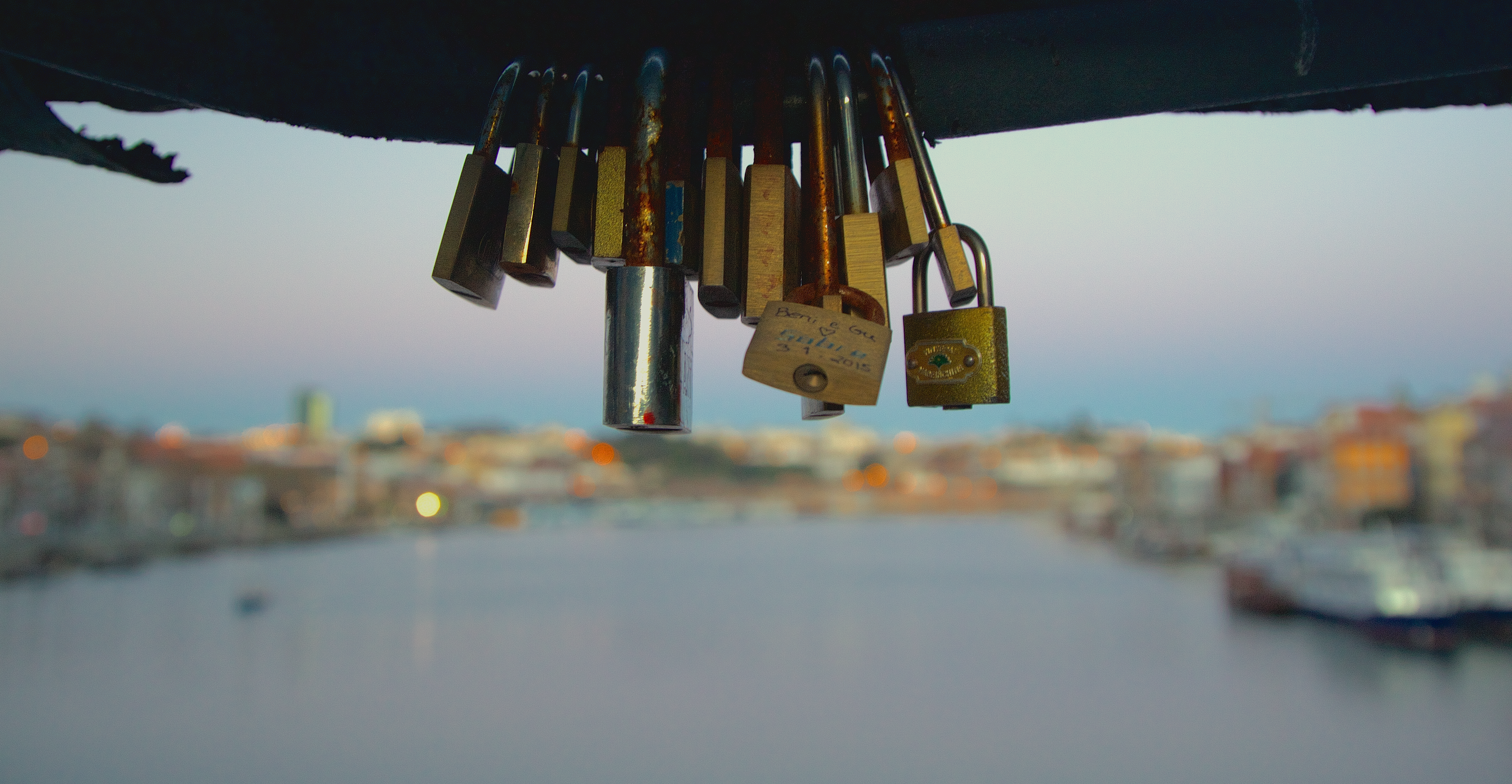
Love locks on the bridge, 2021
