= Pólo Universitário station =

Underground light rail station on the Porto Metro in Porto, Portugal

Pólo Universitário
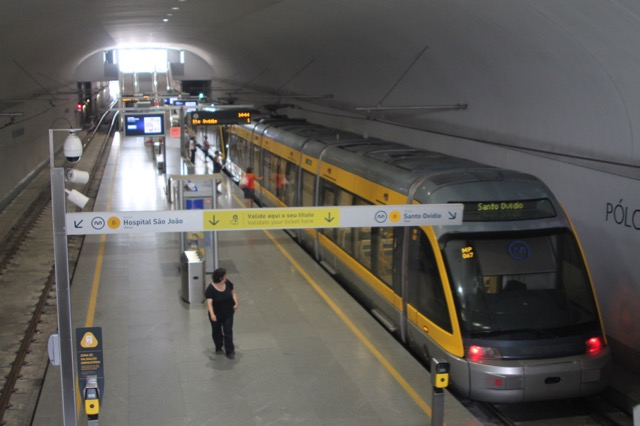

General information
- Location: Porto; Portugal
- Coordinates: 41°10′29″N 8°36′13″W
- System: Porto Metro station
- Platforms: 1 island platform
- Tracks: 2

Construction
- Structure type: Underground
- Accessible: Yes

History
- Opened: 17 September 2005

Services
Preceding station	Porto Metro	Following station
IPO towards Hospital de São João	Line D	Salgueiros towards Vila d'Este
Location

Pólo Universitário is an underground light rail station on line D of the Porto Metro system in Porto, Portugal. It is situated under Rua Alfredo Allen on the University of Porto campus, from which it takes its name. Immediately to the north of Pólo Universitário station, the line emerges from its tunnel and continues at street level for the remainder of its route.

The central tunnelled section of line D, including Pólo Universitário station, opened on 17 September 2005, with trains initially running from Câmara de Gaia, to the south. Pólo Universitário was the northern terminus until 31 March 2006, when the line was extended to Hospital de São João. The line has since been extended from Câmara de Gaia to Vila d’Este.

The station is preceded by Salgueiros and followed by IPO stations. On weekdays, trains run every five to six minutes, declining to every 10 minutes on weekends and evenings. The station platforms are underground, and there are two through tracks, served by a single central island platform.
