= Hospital de São João station =

Light rail station on the Porto Metro in Porto, Portugal

Hospital de São João
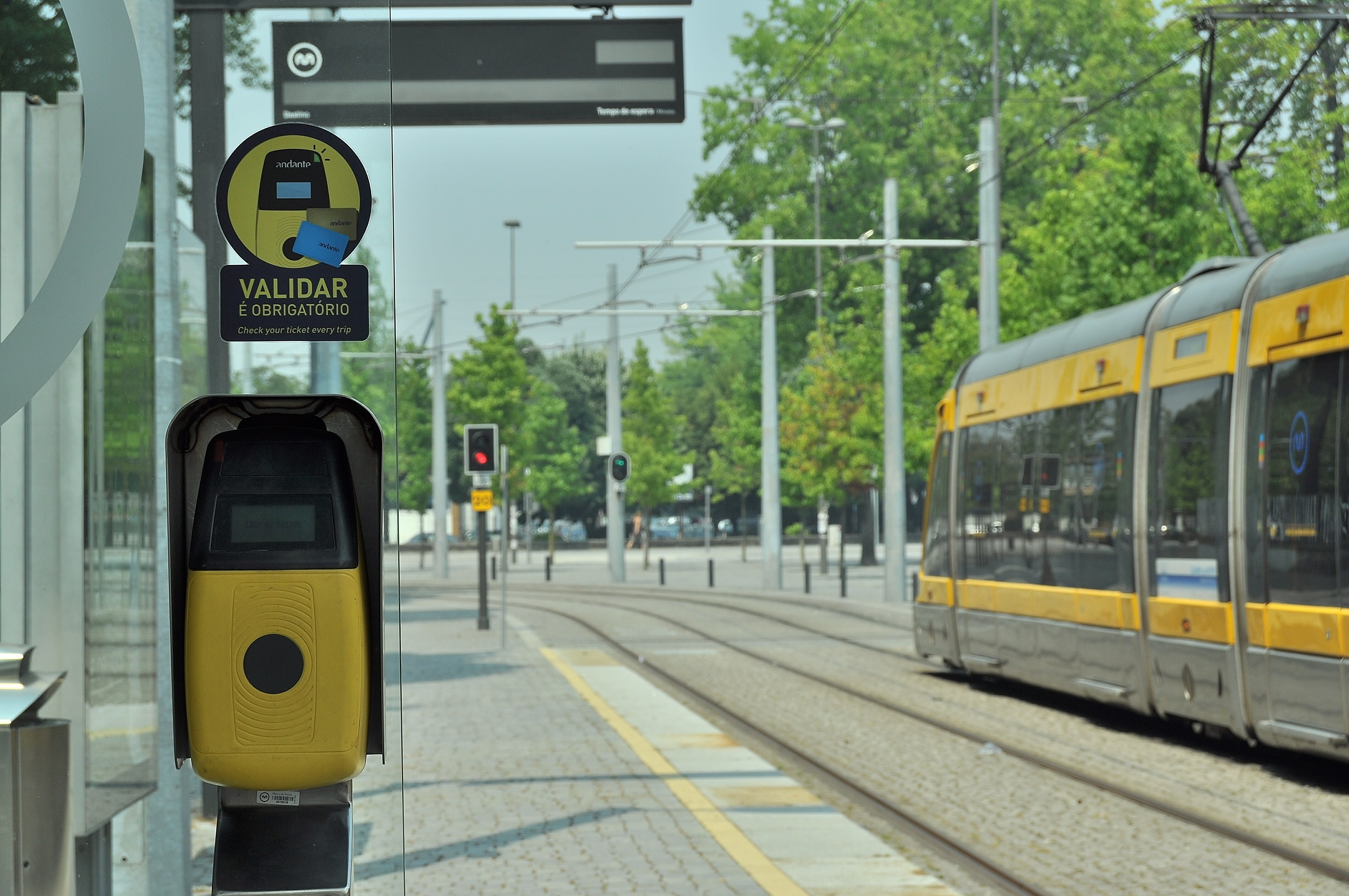

General information
- Location: Portugal
- Coordinates: 41°11′00″N 8°36′08.87″W
- System: Porto Metro station
- Platforms: 2 side platforms
- Tracks: 2

Construction
- Structure type: At Grade
- Accessible: Yes

History
- Opened: 31 March 2006

Services
Preceding station	Porto Metro	Following station
Terminus	Line D	IPO towards Vila d'Este
Location

Hospital de São João is a light rail station that is the terminus of line D of the Porto Metro system in Porto, Portugal. It is named after the nearby University Hospital of São João. It serves the hospital as well as the Asprela Campus of the University of Porto, and is a transfer point between the Metro and urban and suburban bus services.

The station is followed by IPO station. On weekdays, trains run every five to six minutes, declining to every 10 minutes on weekends and evenings. The station platforms are on the surface, and are directly accessed from the street. There are two terminal tracks, each served by a side platform.

Although the central section of line D opened in 2005, the IPO and Hospital de São João stations did not open until 31 March 2006, with the line terminating at Pólo Universitário station in the interim. This was because the Escola Superior de Enfermagem, a nursing school, objected to the new line because of safety concerns from the trains running near the entrance of the school. Before opening, the sidewalk was set back and a traffic light was placed at the intersection to reduce the risk of accidents between trains and cars.

Between 29 August 2021 and 28 January 2022, the station was closed for a renovation project, which involved the construction of a covered interchange. During this period, alternate trains terminated at IPO and Pólo Universitário stations.
