= Vila d'Este station =

Light rail station on the Porto Metro in Porto, Portugal

Vila d'Este
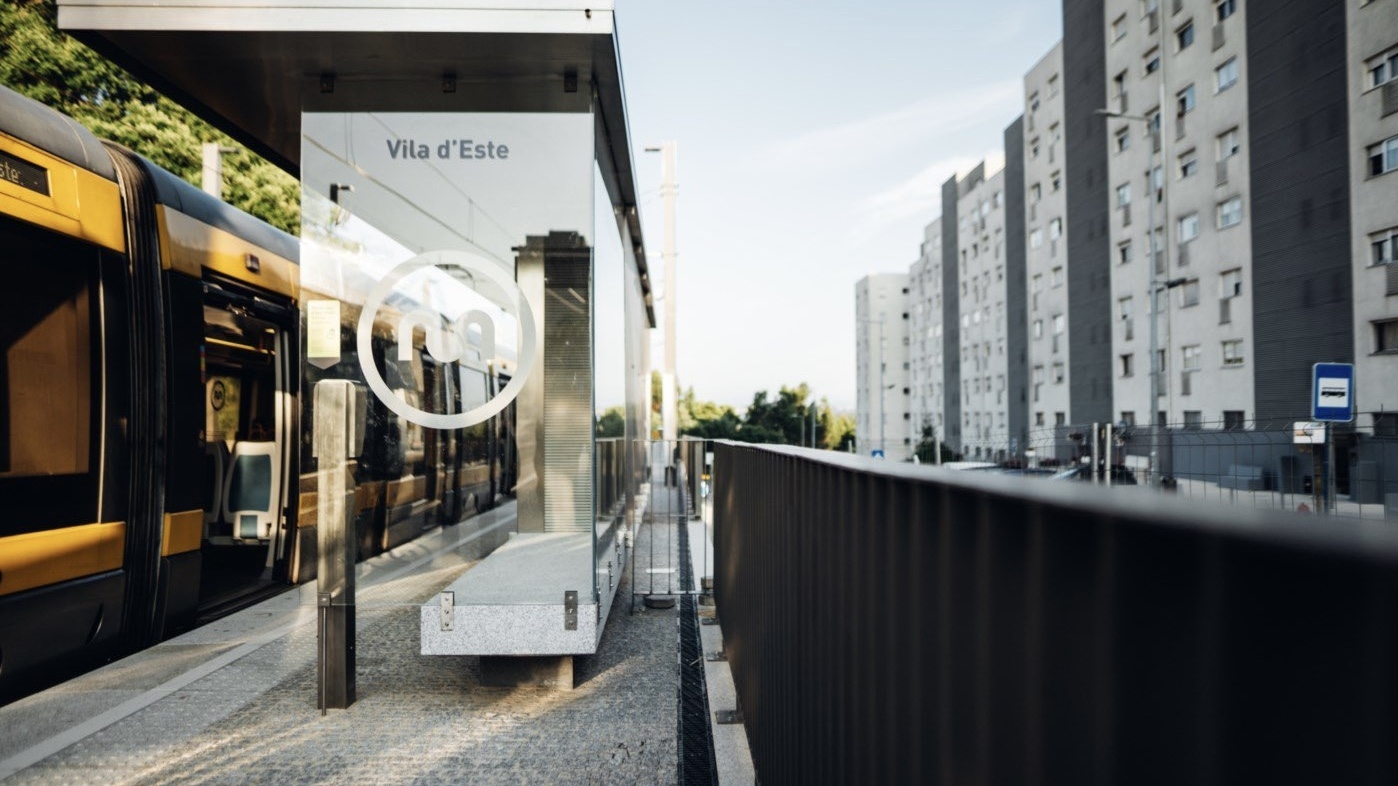

General information
- Location: Vila Nova de Gaia; Portugal
- Coordinates: 41°5′55″N 8°35′19″W
- System: Porto Metro station

Construction
- Structure type: At Grade
- Accessible: Yes

History
- Opened: 28 June 2024

Services
Preceding station	Porto Metro	Following station
Hospital do Santos Silva towards Hospital de São João	Line D	Terminus
Location

Vila d'Este is a light rail station that is the terminus of line D of the Porto Metro system in Vila Nova de Gaia, Portugal. The station opened, along with the extension of line D from its previous terminus at Santo Ovídio, on 28 June 2024.

The station is followed by Hospital Santos Silva. On weekdays, trains run every 10 to 12 minutes, declining to every 20 minutes on weekends and evenings. The station is on the surface, alongside R. Salgueiro Maia.
