= Legoland =

Global theme park chain based on the Lego brand of toys

Legoland Parks
- Type: Subsidiary
- Industry: Theme parks, attractions, family entertainment centers
- Founded: 7 June 1968; 58 years ago (Legoland Billund)
- Number of locations: 12 (plus 3 planned)
- Area served: China, Denmark, Germany, Italy, Japan, Malaysia, South Korea, United Arab Emirates, United Kingdom, United States
- Services: Theme parks; Hotel lodging
- Parent: Merlin Entertainments
- Website: www.legoland.com

Legoland (/ˈlɛɡoʊlænd/, trademarked in uppercase as LEGOLAND) is a chain of family amusement parks focusing on the Lego building toy brand. They are owned and operated by the British theme park company Merlin Entertainments, which shares a common owner (Kirkbi A/S) with the Lego Group.

Legoland Billund Resort opened in Billund, Denmark, in 1968, followed by Legoland Windsor Resort in Windsor, United Kingdom, in 1996. Further parks opened in Germany, Japan, South Korea, Malaysia, the United Arab Emirates (Dubai), the United States (California, Florida, and New York), and a Legoland Water Park at Gardaland in Castelnuovo del Garda, Italy throughout the 21st century. In 2025, a park in Shanghai was opened with three more in China currently under construction (Beijing, Sichuan, and Shenzhen).

== Attractions ==
The parks are marketed to families with children between ages 2–12, and most attractions are geared towards younger children. Attractions consist primarily of outdoor flat rides, dark rides, interactive play structures, and splash pads, as well as designated stations for playing with Lego bricks. Some locations usually have rollercoasters, like the one in Florida.

== Parks ==
There are 12 Legoland parks currently in operation and 3 planned parks.

Locations of Legoland parks across the world — parks opened, parks in progress of build, water parks

=== Asia ===
Site	City	Country	Opened	Details
Legoland Malaysia Resort	Iskandar Puteri, Johor	Malaysia	15 September 2012	The first Legoland in Asia. Initially, there are 8 themed areas of attractions for all ages: Miniland, The Beginning, Lego Ninjago World, Land of Adventure, Imagination, Lego Kingdoms, Lego Technic, and Lego City. The centerpiece of the park is Miniland, where almost all Asian landmarks were built using Lego bricks. A companion Legoland Water Park was built by 11 March 2016.
Legoland Dubai	Dubai	United Arab Emirates	31 October 2016	It was originally scheduled to open in 2011 in Dubailand as "Legoland Dubailand", but was then delayed until October 2016 and is now located at Dubai Parks and Resorts and Water Park as "Legoland Dubai". It has six areas: Factory, Lego City, Imagination, Kingdoms, Adventure, and the first indoor Miniland. The Park contains over 15000 Lego models by using 15 Million Lego Bricks.
Legoland Japan Resort	Nagoya	Japan	1 April 2017	On 30 June 2014, Merlin and Nagoya city officially announced that they had signed a contract to construct Legoland Japan, to open in Nagoya harbour, Japan, in February 2017. Construction officially began 15 April 2015. The park was expected to cost around US$15 million to construct for the first stage. The park officially opened on 1 April 2017. The second stage of the Legoland was completed in 2021.
Legoland Korea Resort	Chuncheon, Gangwon Province	South Korea	5 May 2022	It is the first Legoland built on an island and is Asia's largest Legoland at nearly 1.3 million square meters including a Lego hotel, condos, water park, spa and outlets. Construction of the bridge connecting the Legoland island to Chuncheon station officially began on 28 November 2014, and construction of the theme park finished by 26 March 2022. Located next to Seoul Metropolitan Subway's Chuncheon station, the site is a 1-hour trip from Seoul via the ITX train. The park officially opened on 5 May 2022.
Legoland Shanghai Resort	Jinshan District, Shanghai	China	5 July 2025	On 6 November 2019, Merlin and China Media Capital announced a £500 million joint venture investment to build a Legoland amusement park in Shanghai, China. The park opened on 5 July 2025, and is located close to the Jinshan North railway station. Opened as the world's largest Legoland.

=== Europe ===
Site	City	Country	Opened	Details
Legoland Billund Resort	Billund	Denmark	7 June 1968	The oldest Legoland and was built near the original Lego factory. It is divided into ten different worlds: Duplo Land, Imagination Zone, Legoredo Town, Adventure Land, Miniland, Pirate Land, Lego City, Knights Kingdom, Viking Land, Ninjago World, Lego Movie World, and Polar Land. The park has 1.6 million visitors annually, making it the largest tourist attraction in Denmark outside Copenhagen.
Legoland Windsor Resort	Windsor, Berkshire	United Kingdom	17 March 1996	Built on the site of the previous Windsor Safari Park. There are twelve areas in the park: The Beginning, Bricktopia, Miniland, Duplo Valley, Heartlake City, Lego City, Land of the Vikings, Kingdom of the Pharaohs, Ninjago World, Pirates Shores, Knights Kingdom and Lego Mythica. It is the largest Legoland park in the world in terms of area – its area is approximately five times greater than that of Legoland Billund.
Legoland Deutschland Resort	Günzburg	Germany	17 May 2002	The smallest Legoland outside of Asia. There are nine areas in the park: Imagination Center, Miniland, Lego X-treme, Lego City, Knights Kingdom, Adventure Land, Ninjago World, Land of the Pirates and Lego Mythica. The resort will see the addition of Peppa Pig Park for 2024, making it the second Legoland resort to have a non-Lego themed attraction and Peppa Pig theme park.
Legoland Water Park Gardaland	Castelnuovo del Garda	Italy	15 June 2021	Standalone waterpark at Gardaland Resort.

=== North America ===
Site	City	Country	Opened	Details
Legoland California Resort	Carlsbad, California	United States	20 March 1999	The park is split into nine sections: The Beginning, Explorer Island, Lego Movie World, Fun Town, Castle Hill, Miniland USA, Imagination Zone, Pirate Shores, Ninjago World, and Land of Adventure. A Sea Life aquarium is adjacent to Legoland California. In 2010, a water park opened on its grounds, as one of the only three of Legoland parks (Followed by Legoland Florida [Formerly known as Splash Island], Malaysia, and Dubai) to feature a water park. On 24 May 2014, an add-on was built for the water park, themed after Legends of Chima.
Legoland Florida Resort	Winter Haven, Florida	United States	15 October 2011	Legoland Florida opened a water park replacing the former Cypress Gardens "Splash Island" water park on 26 May 2012, and became a resort following the opening of the Legoland Hotel in 2013. A theme park in-relation to the children's animated series Peppa Pig (rights currently owned by Hasbro) opened on the resort grounds on 24 February 2022, making it the first Legoland Resort to feature a park based on a non-Lego related property.
Legoland New York Resort	Goshen, New York	United States	29 May 2021	New York, just south of the former Arden Hill Hospital. The park was originally scheduled to open along with a hotel on 4 July 2020, but the opening was pushed back until 2021 due to the COVID-19 pandemic. Eventually, the park opened on 29 May 2021.

== Future parks ==
Asia

Site	Proposed location	Country	Planned opening date	Details
Legoland Shenzhen Resort	Dapeng New District, Shenzhen	China	2027	A Legoland Shenzhen Resort is planned to open in the Dapeng Peninsula. It is said to become the world largest Legoland Resort and will cover 580,000 square metres. Construction has officially begun with a groundbreaking ceremony that outlined the plans for the huge brick-based theme park.
Legoland Beijing Resort	Fangshan District, Beijing	China	2028	Merlin Entertainments is continuing its expansion across China with plans for a new Legoland resort in the Fangshan district of Beijing. The resort will cover an area of 304,000 square meters and will house a theme park and hotel.
Legoland Sichuan Resort	Chengdu, Sichuan	China	TBA	On 27 September 2019, Merlin and Global Zhongjun announced a Legoland Resort in Sichuan Province. The resort was scheduled to open in 2023, however this date was pushed back to 2025, before being delayed again.

== Former park ==
Europe

Site	Location	Country	Opened	Closed	Details
Legoland Sierksdorf	Sierksdorf	Germany	1973	1976	There was an earlier Legoland Park in Germany, from 1973 to 1976. It was located in the city of Sierksdorf in northern Germany. In 1976, the park was sold; the former Legoland Sierksdorf is now Hansa-Park.

== Cancelled park ==
Europe

Site	Proposed location	Country	Year planned to open	Year cancelled	Details
Legoland Belgium	Gosselies	Belgium	2027	2023	In September 2020, the Brussels Times reported that Merlin Entertainment was planning on building a new Legoland park on the former site of Caterpillar's Gosselies factory. Although Walloon Minister for the Economy Willy Borsus confirmed it was possible, but it was still in the early planning stages. On 30 August 2022, it was confirmed it would open in 2027. The project was cancelled on 24 March 2023.

== See also ==
- Legoland Discovery Centre
- Universal Destinations & Experiences
