= Legoland (disambiguation) =

Legoland is a chain of family theme parks featuring the toy Lego.

Legoland may also refer to:

- Legoland (video game), a 1999 video game
- Legoland Billund, the original Legoland park
- Legoland (Theme), the theme/system of Lego building sets which incorporated Town, Space and Castle product lines
- Southgate Estate, a modernist housing estate in Runcorn, demolished in 1990–92, was widely known as Legoland
- The SIS Building, the headquarters of MI6 at Vauxhall Cross in London, nicknamed "Legoland" by secret agents
- Legoland, a Canadian play best known as the spiritual predecessor to the musical Ride the Cyclone

== See also ==
- List of Legoland parks
- Legoland Water Park (disambiguation)
