= Blue Tornado =

Blue Tornado may refer to:

- Blue Tornado (film), 1991 Italian film
- Blue Tornado (roller coaster), at Gardaland
- "Blue Tornado", mascot of The McCallie School
