= Space Vertigo =

Drop tower at Gardaland

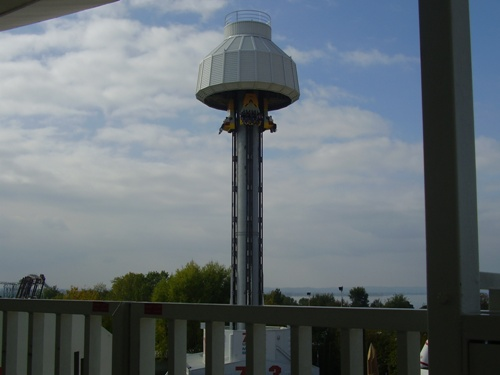

Gardaland
- Status: Operating
- Opening date: 1998

Ride statistics
- Attraction type: Drop tower
- Manufacturer: Intamin
- Model: Giant Drop
- Theme: Space
- Height: 40 m (130 ft)
- Speed: 65 km/h (40 mph)
- G-force: 2.8
- Vehicle type: Gondola
- Vehicles: 4
- Riders per vehicle: 4
- Duration: 0:30
- Height restriction: 140–195 cm (4 ft 7 in – 6 ft 5 in)

Space Vertigo is a drop tower located at Gardaland. It was the first drop tower-type ride to open in Italy.

== History ==
In 1998, Gardaland was undergoing a large expansion. Part of this expansion was the addition of Blue Tornado as the first inverted coaster in Italy, and Space Vertigo as the first drop tower in Italy. Originally, the ride was a standalone attraction; however, over time, the park added Flying Island in 2000 and Oblivion: The Black Hole in 2015 to create a space-themed land.

== Ride experience ==
Riders enter the themed queue through a turnstile that counts guests automatically, similar to other attractions in Gardaland. Throughout the queue, screens detail the story: Guests take the roles of astronauts on a lunar base ravaged by an alien virus. The only way to escape is to board the tower and drop down through the atmosphere. The queue itself is stylized to look like a futuristic space station. After traversing the queue, guests enter the load platform. They are then assigned seats on one of four gondolas. After being dispatched, the gondolas ascend the 40-meter tower at 5 metres per second (18 km/h) before arriving at a structure encasing the top (similar to Hurakan Condor) and waiting 5 seconds atop the tower before dropping, reaching a speed of 65 km/h before engaging the magnetic eddy current brakes and returning to the platform, ending the experience.

== See also ==
- Hollywood Action Tower, a "precursor" to Space Vertigo at Movieland Park
- Giant Drop (Six Flags Great America), a similar ride at Six Flags Great America
- Apocalypse (Drayton Manor), a similar ride formerly at Drayton Manor
