= Shaman (roller coaster) =

Amusement ride in Gardaland

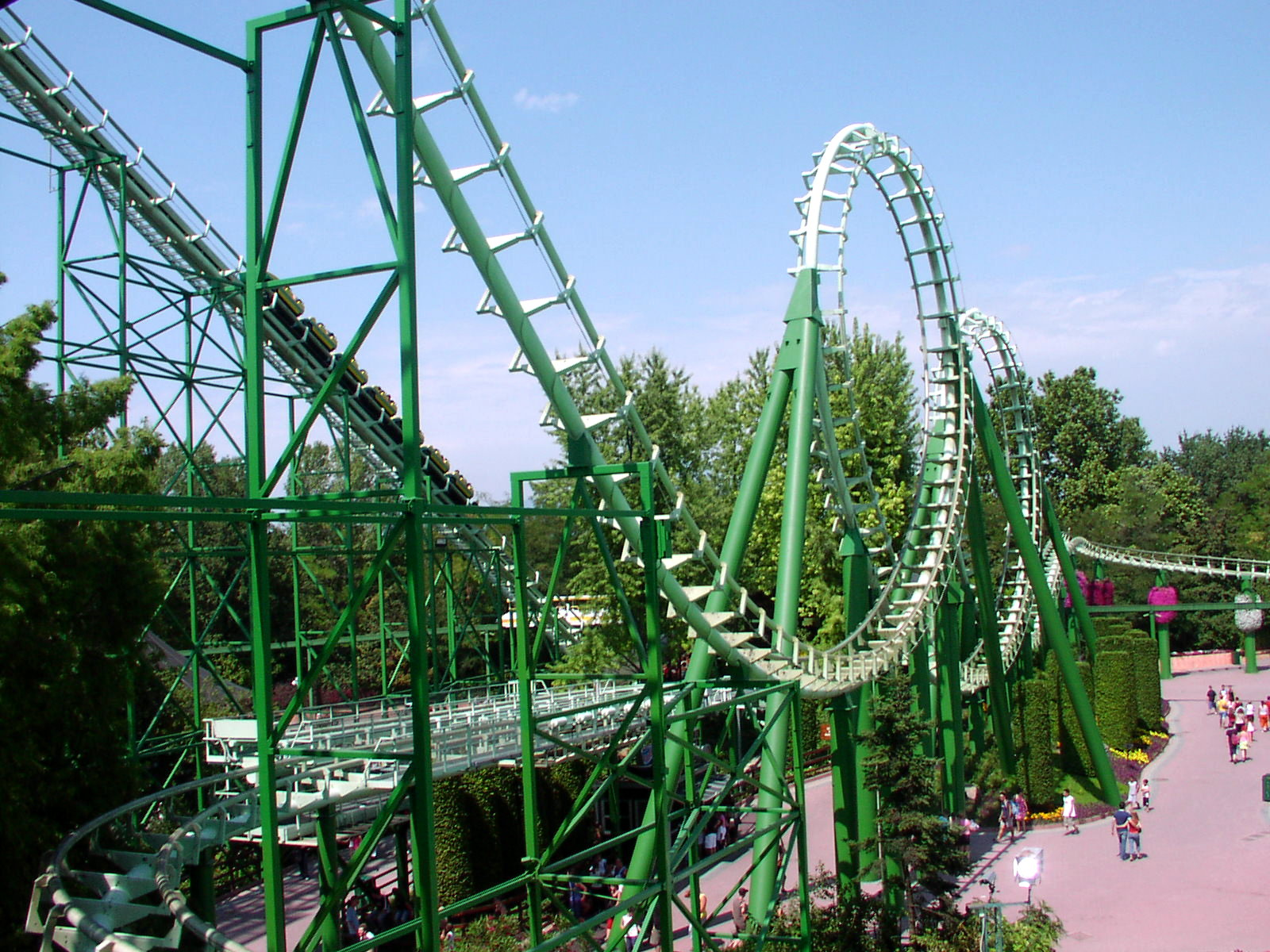
- Photo of Shaman when it was known as Magic Mountain (2005).

Gardaland
- Location: Gardaland
- Coordinates: 45°27′24″N 10°42′26″E
- Status: Operating
- Opening date: 1985

General statistics
- Type: Steel
- Manufacturer: Vekoma
- Designer: Vekoma
- Model: Double Loop with Corkscrew
- Track layout: Mk-1200 Double Loop Corkscrew
- Lift/launch system: Chain lift hill
- Height: 98.5 ft (30.0 m)
- Drop: 82 ft (25 m)
- Length: 2,296.7 ft (700.0 m)
- Speed: 43.5 mph (70.0 km/h)
- Inversions: 4
- Duration: 2 min
- Max vertical angle: 45°
- Capacity: 1000 riders per hour
- G-force: 3.5
- Height restriction: 120–205 cm (3 ft 11 in – 6 ft 9 in)
- Shaman at RCDB

Shaman is a steel roller coaster located at Gardaland, Castelnuovo del Garda near Verona, Italy. Manufactured by Vekoma, the roller coaster originally opened as Magic Mountain, featuring Arrow Dynamics trains, which were replaced with newer Vekoma trains in 2008. A VR experience and additional new theming was added to the ride in 2017, and it was renamed Shaman. The VR was removed the following year. In November 2020, Gardaland began removing parts of the track. It was replaced with new track pieces, similar to what was done on Python at Efteling, to improve the smoothness of the ride experience. The supports & other theming items were also repainted to improve the theming of the area.

== Gallery ==
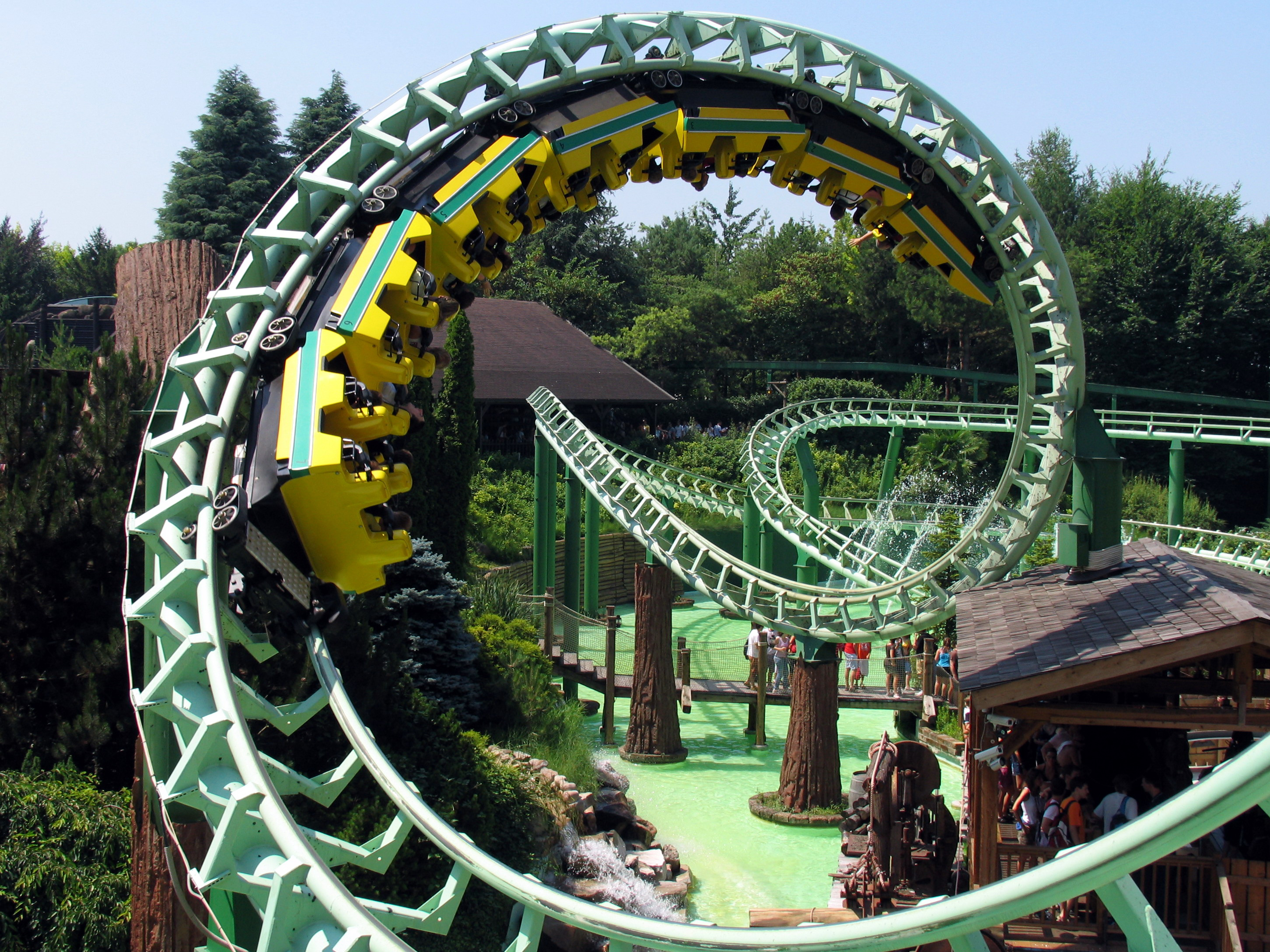
A train going through one of the ride's corkscrews.

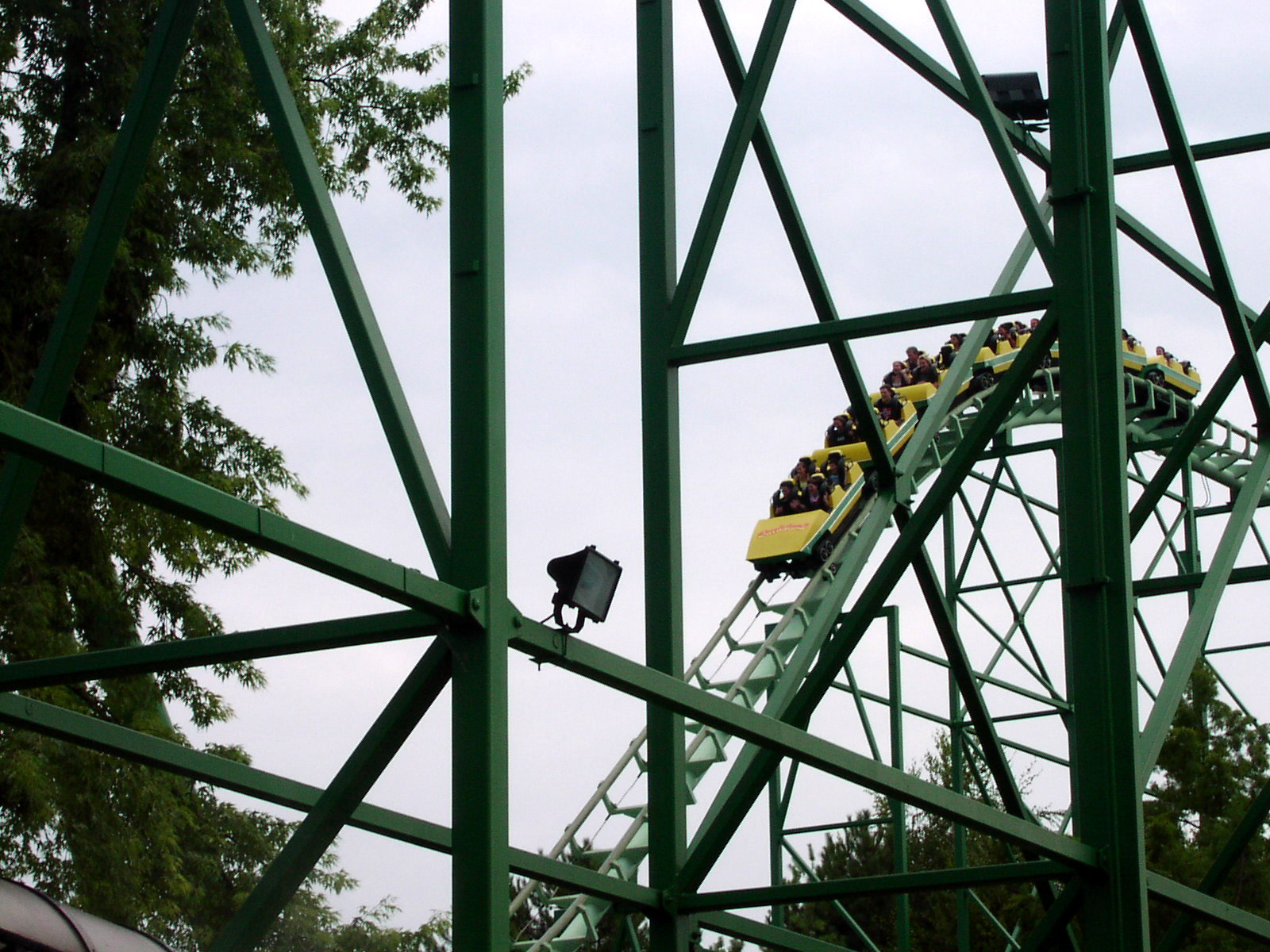
Magic Mountain
