= Legoland Water Park =

Legoland Water Park may refer to several water parks adjacent to Legoland theme parks:

- Legoland Water Park (California), U.S.
- Legoland Water Park (Florida), U.S.
- Legoland Water Park (Gardaland), Italy
- Legoland Water Park (Malaysia)
