= Mammut (roller coaster) =

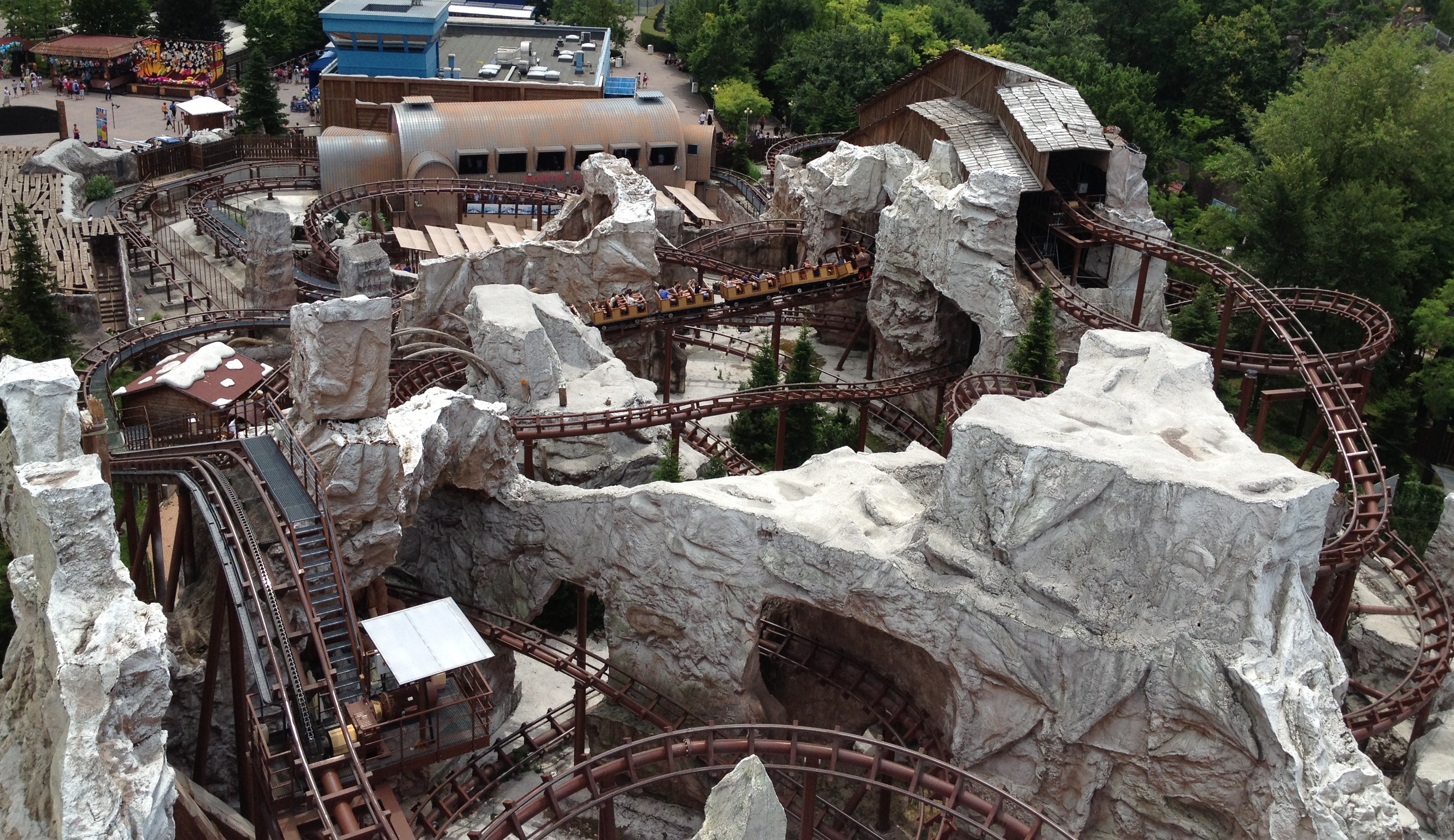

Gardaland
- Location: Gardaland
- Coordinates: 45°27′28″N 10°42′45″E
- Status: Operating
- Opening date: March 19, 2008

General statistics
- Type: Steel – Mine Train
- Manufacturer: Vekoma
- Model: Custom MK-900 M
- Lift/launch system: Chain lift hill
- Height: 45.11 ft (13.75 m)
- Length: 3,379.3 ft (1,030.0 m)
- Speed: 31.1 mph (50.1 km/h)
- Inversions: 0
- Duration: 2:45
- Trains: 3 trains with 6 cars. Riders arranged 2 across in 3 rows, with the exception of the first car, which has a single row, for a total of 32 riders per train.
- Mammut at RCDB

Mammut (Italian for Mammoth) is a steel mine train roller coaster from the company Vekoma located in Gardaland, Italy. It is the third roller coaster of this company in the park and is the largest coaster for families at the park.

Mammut was inaugurated in 2008. The 5,000 m^{2} large area, where this attraction was built, was previously occupied by a complex of paid games.

== Gallery ==
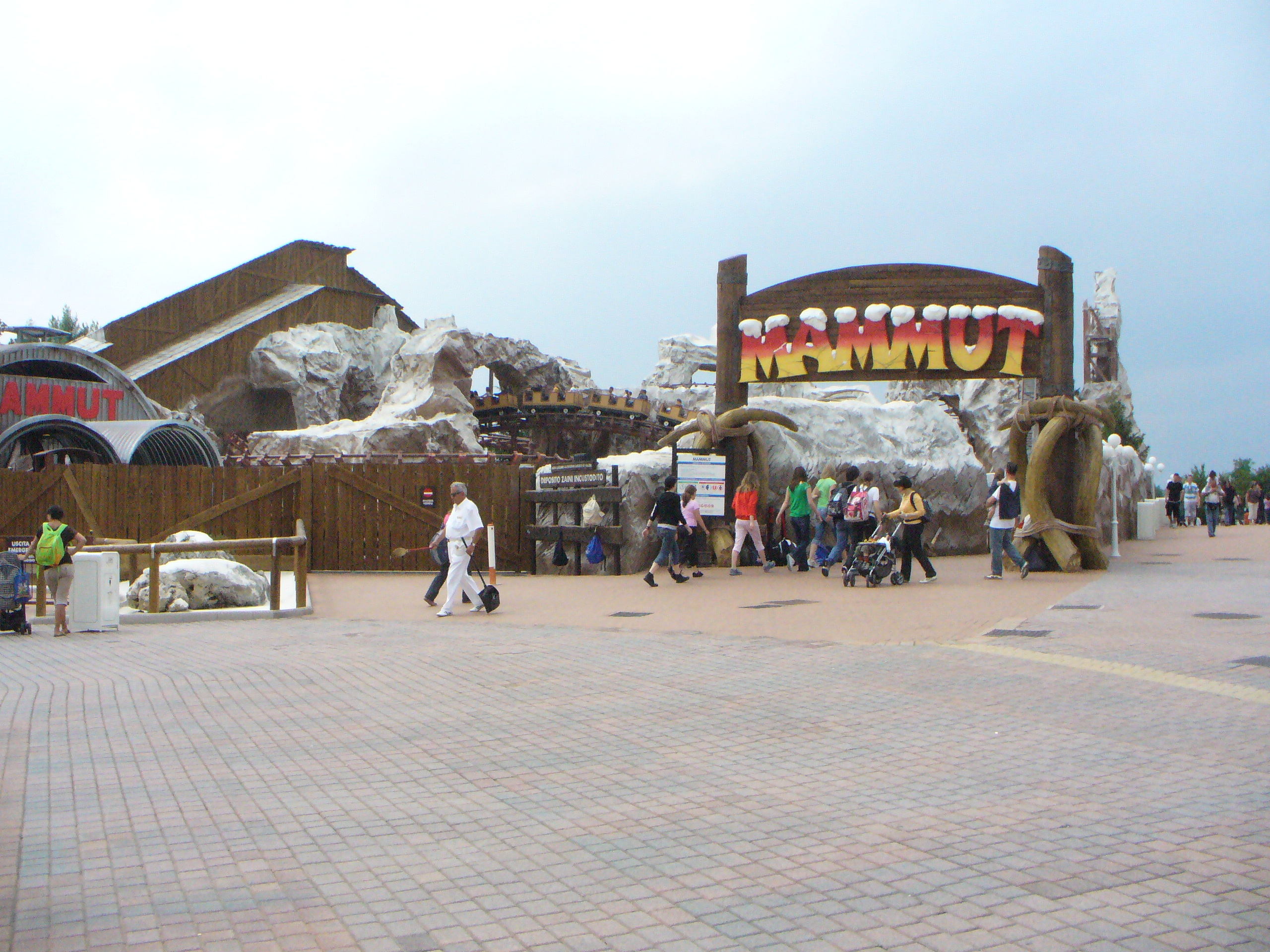
Entrance to the coaster

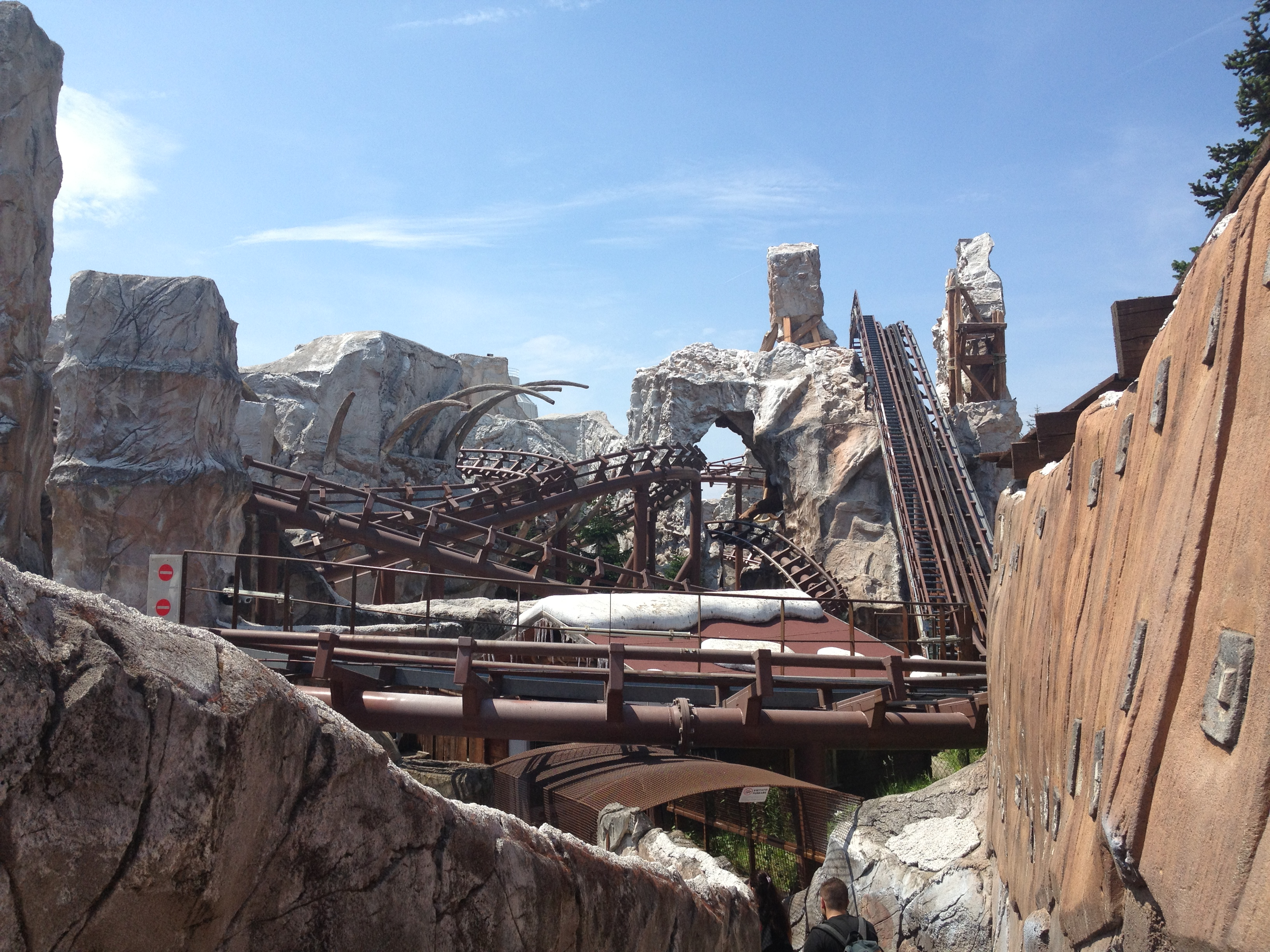
Tracks
