= Sequoia Adventure =

Sequoia Magic Loop
- Previously known as Sequoia Adventure
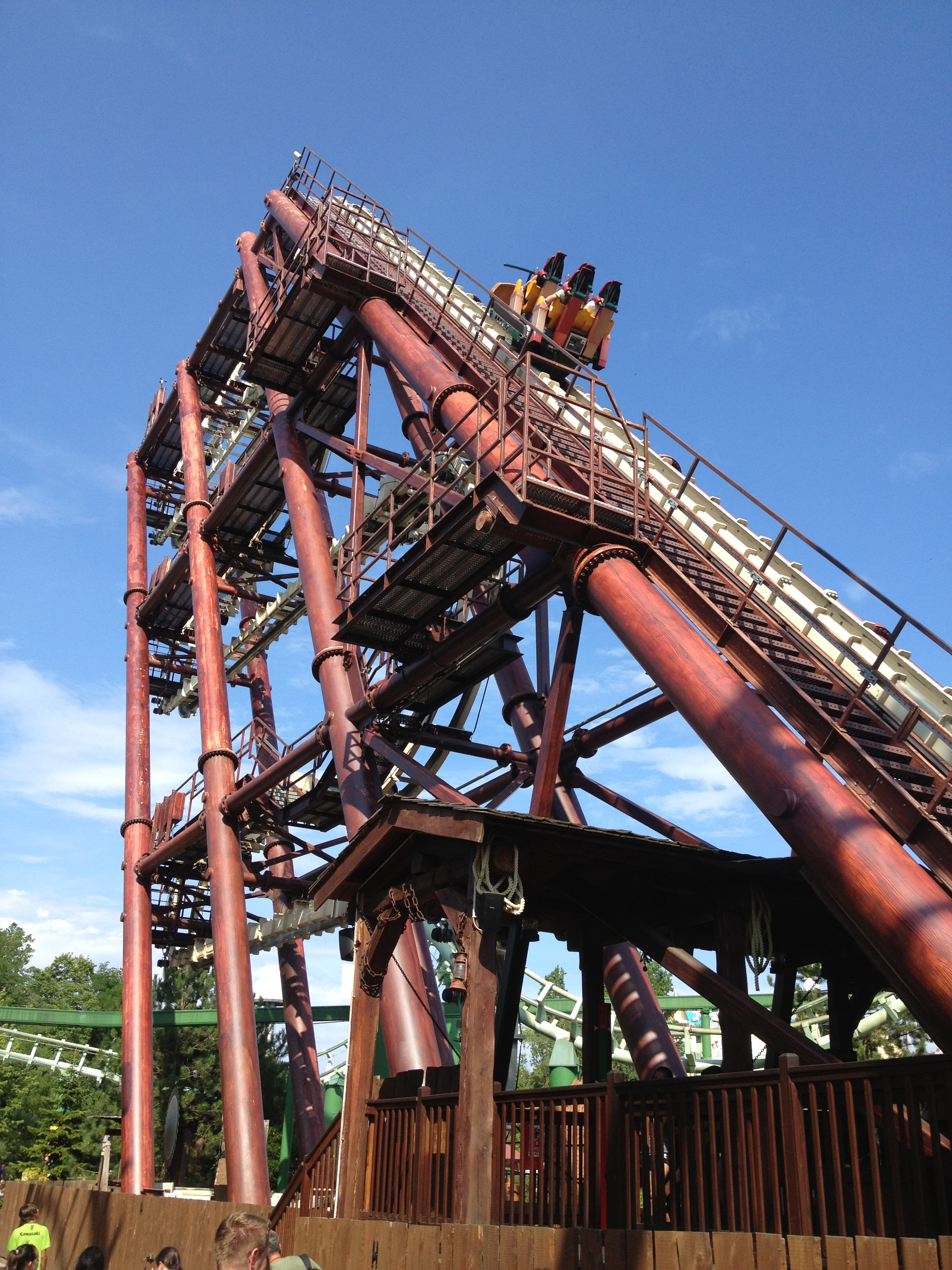

Gardaland
- Location: Gardaland
- Coordinates: 45.4570°N 10.7076°E
- Status: Removed
- Opening date: April 30, 2005

General statistics
- Type: Steel
- Manufacturer: S&S – Sansei Technologies
- Model: Screaming Squirrel
- Lift/launch system: Chain Lift Hill
- Height: 98.4 ft (30.0 m)
- Inversions: 3
- Duration: 1 minute and 25 seconds
- Max vertical angle: 180 degrees°
- Height restriction: 140 cm (4 ft 7 in)
- Trains: 3 trains with a single car. Riders are arranged 2 across in 2 rows for a total of 4 riders per train.
- Single rider line not available
- Sequoia Magic Loop at RCDB

Sequoia Magic Loop was an S&S - Sansei Technologies inverted Screaming Squirrel steel roller coaster located in Gardaland, Italy. The ride opened in 2005 with the name Sequoia Adventure. Riders spent a considerable time inverted, with three 'saxophone' inversions where the cars turned 180 degrees onto a flat inverted section of track.

== History ==
Sequoia Adventure opened in 2005 but closed in June 2017 due to mechanical issues. It was scheduled to reopen in 2018. In November 2018, Gardaland confirmed that the ride would reopen in 2019 with a magic theme and a new name, Sequoia Magic Loop. The ride was closed again in 2021 and remained standing but was not operating throughout the 2022 season. In January 2023, the ride was removed from Gardaland.

== Ride experience ==
After departing the station, the car made a 180 degree right turn and began to climb the 98.4ft lift hill. After reaching the top, it then went along a short straight piece of track before entering the first saxophone inversion. The car then came out of the inversion, went along another straight piece of track and proceeded to do the same thing again. After exiting the second inversion, it travelled along a small airtime hill before doing one more saxophone inversion. It then proceeded to do a 180 degree right turn back to the station.

== Technical problems ==
In April 2017, the ride stopped while climbing a ramp thirty metres above the ground. A family of four Israeli passengers was rescued by trained park staff and brought to the ground using an emergency ladder.
