= Prezzemolo =

Italian animated television series

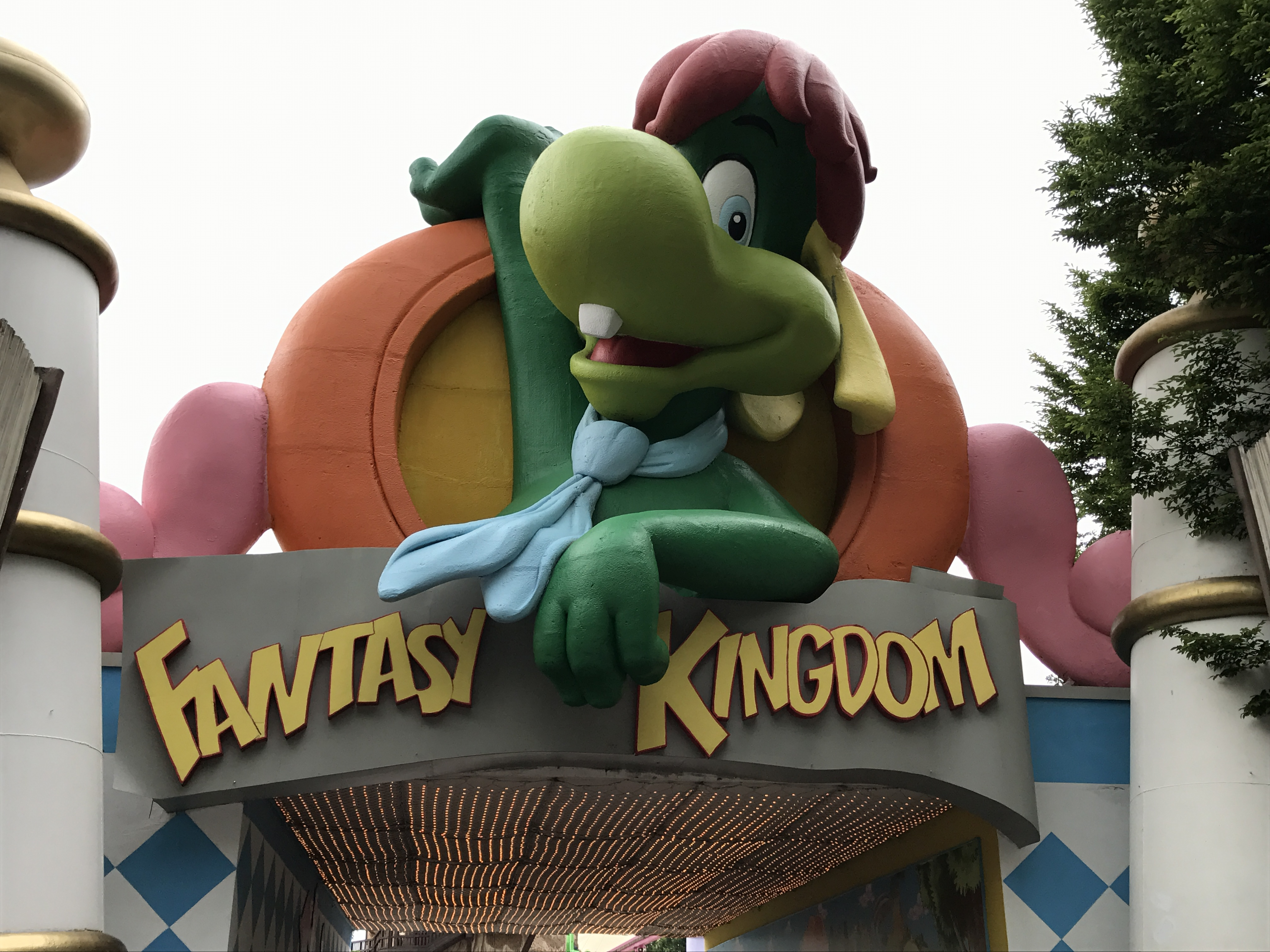
- Prezzemolo, the series' titular character
- Genre: Fantasy adventure, Comedy
- Created by: Lorenzo De Pretto; Giuseppe Ferrario
- Screenplay by: Francesca Giombini; Valentino Grassetti; Luca Raffaelli; Andrea Sfiligoi
- Directed by: Iginio Straffi
- Composers: Roberto Belelli; Enzo Bocciero; Francesco Sardella
- Country of origin: Italy
- Original language: Italian
- No. of episodes: 26

Production
- Production companies: Gardaland; Rainbow S.r.l. Rumblefish VFX (pilot)

Original release
- Network: Italia 1
- Release: September 7, 2002 – March 1, 2003

Prezzemolo is an Italian animated television series created by Lorenzo De Pretto and Giuseppe Ferrario. It is based on characters from the Gardaland theme park, and Gardaland distributes the series. The show was broadcast on Italia 1 from 7 September 2002 to 1 March 2003. It was replayed in the summer of 2005. The pilot episode was animated by Rumblefish VFX. Animation services for the following 26 episodes were provided by Rainbow. Gardaland released the series over six DVDs.

The plot revolves around a dragon named Prezzemolo and his friends. Together they work to defeat the cruel witch Zenda, who wants to take possession of the kingdom of Lomur.

== Characters ==
The characters are based on the mascots of the Gardaland amusement park.

- Prezzemolo, a main protagonist of the series, who lives in Tanaboo and eats pizza with strawberries to become strong and brave but is very shy with Aurora.
- Aurora, a sorceress princess originally from the kingdom of Lomur, who has been cursed exiled by the evil witch Zenda and with the help of Prezzemolo she will try to go back home and defeat her.
- Mousley, a purple bat and Prezzemolo's best friend who will share with him all his adventures in an ironic way and with his unmistakable stubbornness.
- T-Gey, a double-aged tiger and sometimes a bit 'clumsy that follows Prezzemolo but on several occasions will try to hinder him to do only their own interests.
- Pagui, a yellow seagull that accompanies Prezzemolo in his adventure.
- Bamboo, an intelligent scientist panda who tries to help Prezzemolo from his ultratechnologic laboratory of Tanaboo.
- King Astor, Aurora's father.
- Aunt Ofelia, Aurora's aunt.
- Zenda, a main antagonist of the series, a terrible and treacherous witch who wants to take possession of Lomur with the powerful "black fog". She disguised herself as Magda to hinder Prezzemolo and his friends, but failed and in the last battle she was defeated and sealed with a shadow from the penta element in the bowels of the earth, disappearing definitively.
- Shadow, Zenda's henchman, as well as secondary antagonist of the series. It is revealed that he was defeated many years ago by the penthouse being sealed in the bowels of the earth and then revived by Zenda, who frees him from his prison in the last episode and with the witch will clash with Prezzemolo but thanks to aurora the penta element awakens and defeats both him and Zenda together with the black fog that will be dissolved by the colossus that seals again Shadow and this time also Zenda in the bowels of the earth making them disappear permanently.

== Episodes ==
1. "The Challenge"
2. "Strawberry Pizza"
3. "Aurora's Arrival"
4. "The Magic Medallion"
5. "The Giant Stone"
6. "The Maze"
7. "A Dangerous Game"
8. "Ti-gey, Royal Cook"
9. "The King of the Elves"
10. "The Labors of Prezzemolo"
11. "The City of Robots"
12. "The Second Element"
13. "The Submerged World"
14. "Arrangement of Luck"
15. "A Treasure... invisible"
16. "In the Pirates' Den"
17. "A Maghella Without Fear"
18. "In the Land of Fire"
19. "The Oasis of Morgana"
20. "The Magic Sphere"
21. "The Return of Aurora"
22. "The Big Tournament"
23. "The Enemy of Lomur"
24. "The King in Danger"
25. "A Broken Heart"
26. "The Power of the Penta-Element"

== Home media ==
The home video edition consists of 6 DVDs with four episodes each.

- The Challenge contains:
1. "The Challenge"
2. "Strawberry Pizza"
3. "Aurora's Arrival"
4. "The Magic Medallion"
- A Dangerous Game contains:
1. "A Dangerous Game"
2. "Ti-gey, Royal Cook"
3. "The King of the Elves"
4. "The Labors of Prezzemolo"
- The City of Robots contains:
1. "The City of Robots"
2. "The Second Element"
3. "The Submerged World"
4. "Arrangement of Luck"
- A Treasure... invisible contains:
1. "A Treasure... invisible"
2. "In the Pirates' Den"
3. "A Maghella Without Fear"
4. "In the Land of Fire"
- The Oasis of Morgana contains:
1. "The Oasis of Morgana"
2. "The Magic Sphere"
3. "The Return of Aurora"
4. "The Big Tournament"
- The Enemy of Lomur contains:
1. "The Enemy of Lomur"
2. "The King in Danger"
3. "A Broken Heart"
4. "The Power of the Penta-Element"
