= Gardaland =

Amusement park in Northern Italy

Gardaland Resort
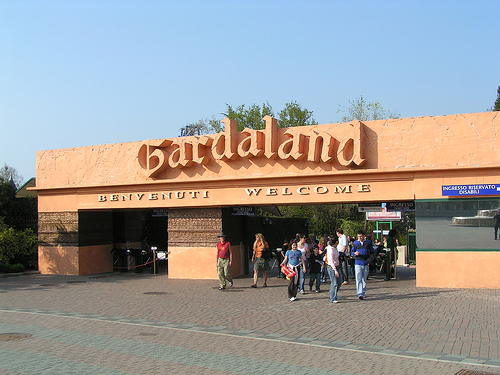
- Gardaland's entrance
- Interactive map of Gardaland Resort
- Location: Castelnuovo del Garda, Italy
- Coordinates: 45°27′16″N 10°42′50″E
- Status: Operating
- Opened: 19 July 1975
- Owner: Merlin Entertainments
- Operating season: Spring-Summer & Holidays
- Attendance: 2,950,000 (2024)
- Area: 520,000 m^{2} (130 acres)

Attractions
- Total: 37
- Roller coasters: 7
- Water rides: 3
- Website: www.gardaland.it

Gardaland Resort is an amusement park resort in Castelnuovo del Garda, Province of Verona, Italy. Opened on 19 July 1975, the resort includes Gardaland Park, Gardaland Sea-Life, Legoland Waterpark, Gardaland Hotel, Adventure Hotel and Magic Hotel. It is adjacent to Lake Garda. The entire complex covers an area of 520,000 m^{2} (5,597,233 sq ft), while the amusement park alone measures 200,000 m^{2} (2,152,782 sq ft).

Since October 2006, the park has been owned by the British company Merlin Entertainments. Major attractions at the park include Mammut, Jungle Rapids, Fuga Da Atlantide, Shaman, Blue Tornado, Raptor and Oblivion: The Black Hole which opened on 28 March 2015. The park's mascot, Prezzemolo, was popular in the Italian licensing market during the 1990s and the 2000s.

With three million annual visitors, Gardaland is ranked as the seventh most visited theme park in Europe.

== History ==
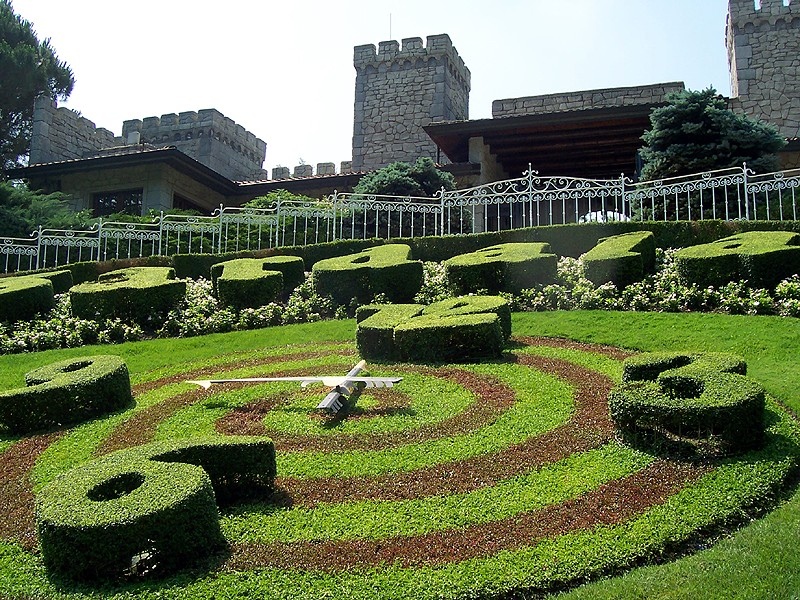
The Castle garden

The concept for Gardaland dates to the early 1970s when Livio Furini, an entrepreneur from Verona, was inspired by Edenlandia in Naples and later by a visit to Disneyland in California. Built on the eastern shore of Lake Garda at Castelnuovo del Garda, Gardaland opened on 19 July 1975, between Peschiera and Lazise.

Furini founded ElettronicAnimazione in 1978, a company that designed theme park attractions. During the 1980s, the first large themed attraction was constructed in the park named The Valley of the Kings. This was followed by the addition of a dark ride named I corsari, Blue Tornado, Jungle Rapids and Space Vertigo.

In 2004, Gardaland Hotel opened, which was the first hotel in Italy to provide themed accommodation. Merlin Entertainments took ownership of the park in 2006. A Sea Life aquarium opened on site in 2008. In the following years, more hotels were built. Gardaland Adventure Hotel opened in 2016 followed by the Gardaland Magic Hotel in 2019. Additionally, the first Legoland Waterpark in Europe was launched in the park in 2021.

Gardaland was forced to close during the COVID-19 pandemic but reopened on 13 June 2020, making it the first Italian amusement park to reopen after the COVID-19 lockdown. The maximum number of daily visitors in that season was restricted to 10,000 per day.

As a result of a global deal with Sony Pictures Entertainment, a variety of rides, food outlets and hotel rooms were developed across Merlin theme parks themed around the Jumanji film franchise. The park opened a ride called Jumanji - The Adventure for the 2022 season, featuring a large animatronic figure. The ride was the first theme park attraction to be based on the Jumanji franchise. In 2023, another Jumanji-themed attraction named Jumanji - The Labyrinth opened in the park, which is a walkthrough attraction featuring a mirror maze and jungle maze.

In 2025, the park celebrated its 50th anniversary. In that year, Gardaland inaugurated a water dark ride named Animal Treasure Island, based on an original intellectual property registered by Merlin Entertainments. The 6,000 square metre ride was an investment of approximately 10 million euros. Additionally, four attractions were introduced to the park in 2025, including a remodelled area named Dragon Empire, Bim Bum Bam Live, a live show based on the Italian television puppet Uan, A.I. – The Future is Here, a multimedia show exploring artificial intelligence, and Prezzemolo and the Mystery of Hidden Worlds, a 4-D cinema show.

== Mascot ==
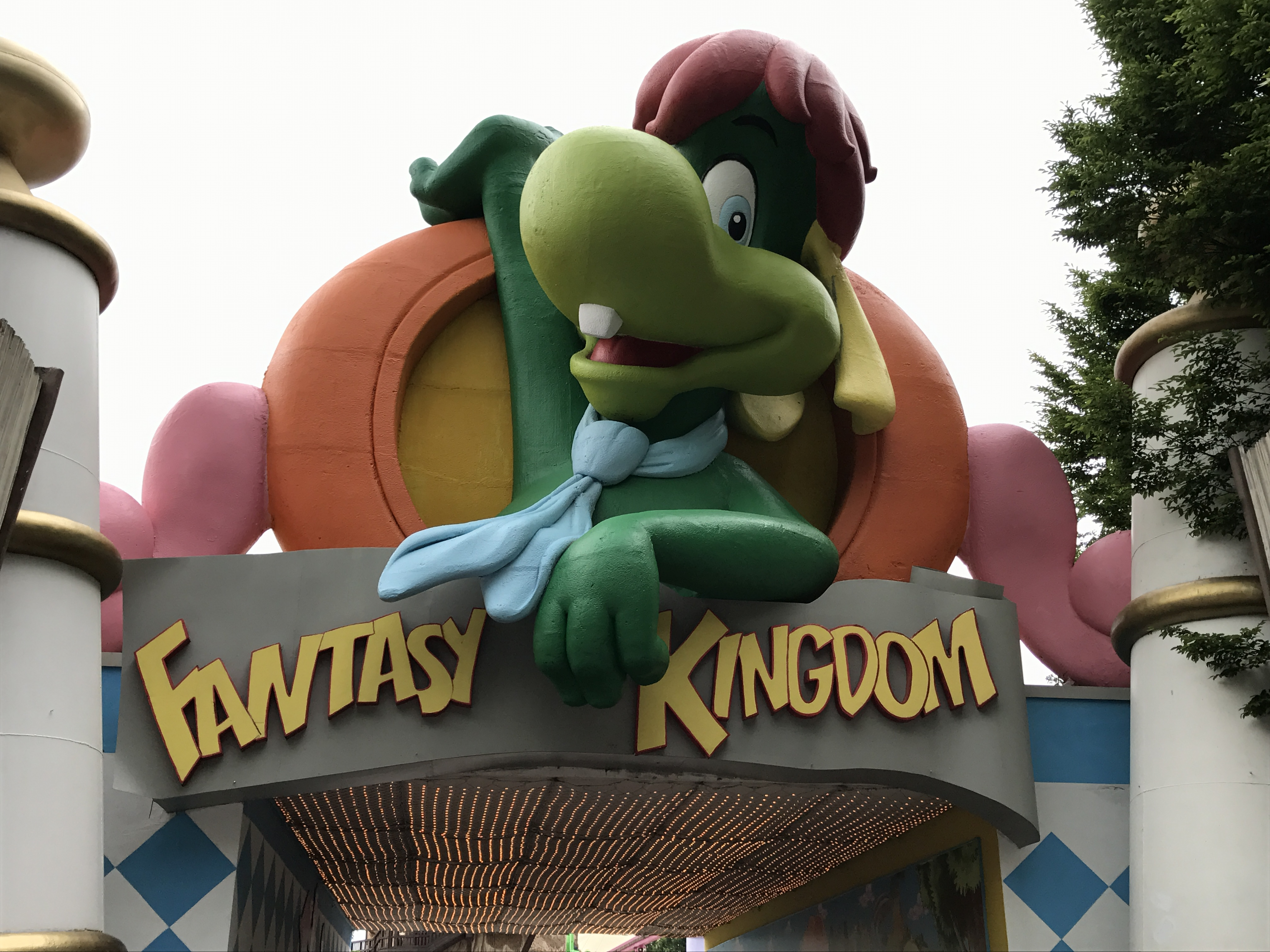
A Gardaland walkway dominated by Prezzemolo

Gardaland's mascot is a young dragon named Prezzemolo, the protagonist of an Italian animated television series. Prezzemolo became the park's mascot in 1984. He was popularised in Italy through cartoon theme songs and Gardaland adverts. In 1993 the park ran a competition to modernise Prezzemolo's image. A local cartoonist won and was responsible for making the character more visually appealing to the public.

== Resort hotels ==
=== Gardaland Hotel ===
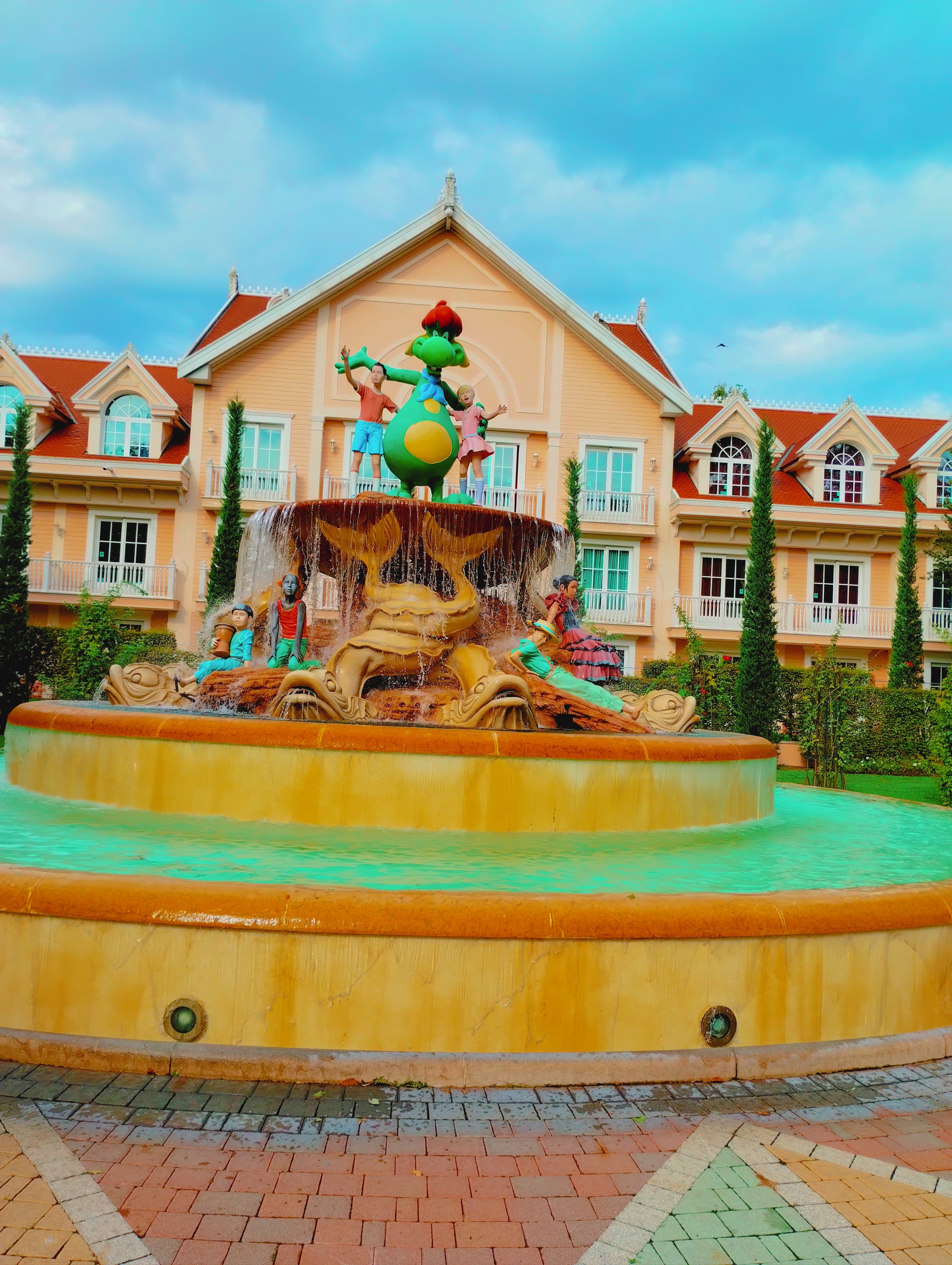
Gardaland Hotel 2023 with Prezzemolo fountain

Gardaland Hotel comprises 247 rooms, including 36 themed rooms. The hotel has two bars, the Wonder Bar in Wonder Palace and the Pool Bar at the Blue Lagoon pool area. The onsite restaurants are the Wonder Restaurant Buffet and the Matka Family Gourmet Restaurant. Alongside the launch of the Jumanji - The Adventure ride in 2022, four Jumanji-themed rooms were introduced to the hotel.

=== Gardaland Adventure Hotel ===
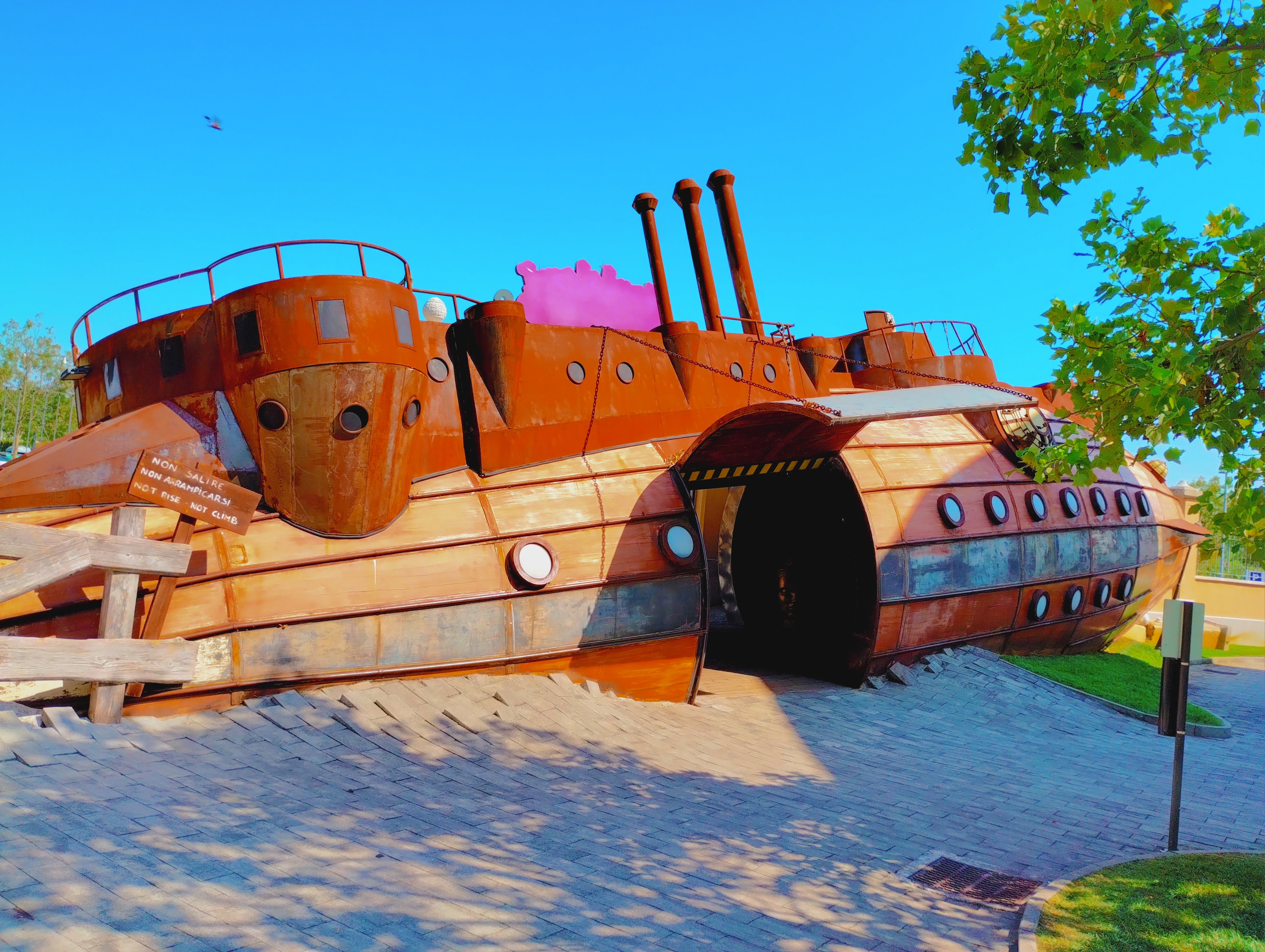
Gardaland Adventure Hotel 2023

In 2016, the Gardaland Adventure Hotel was inaugurated. Constructed across 15,000 square meters, the hotel features 100 themed rooms, including 90 standard rooms, 8 superior rooms and 2 junior suites. The rooms were designed with four themes: the Arctic, Arabian, jungle and the Wild West. The hotel, located adjacent to the Gardaland Hotel, was an investment of 25 million Euros and features the Tutankhamon Restaurant, which was designed to resemble an ancient Egyptian temple.

=== Gardaland Magic Hotel ===
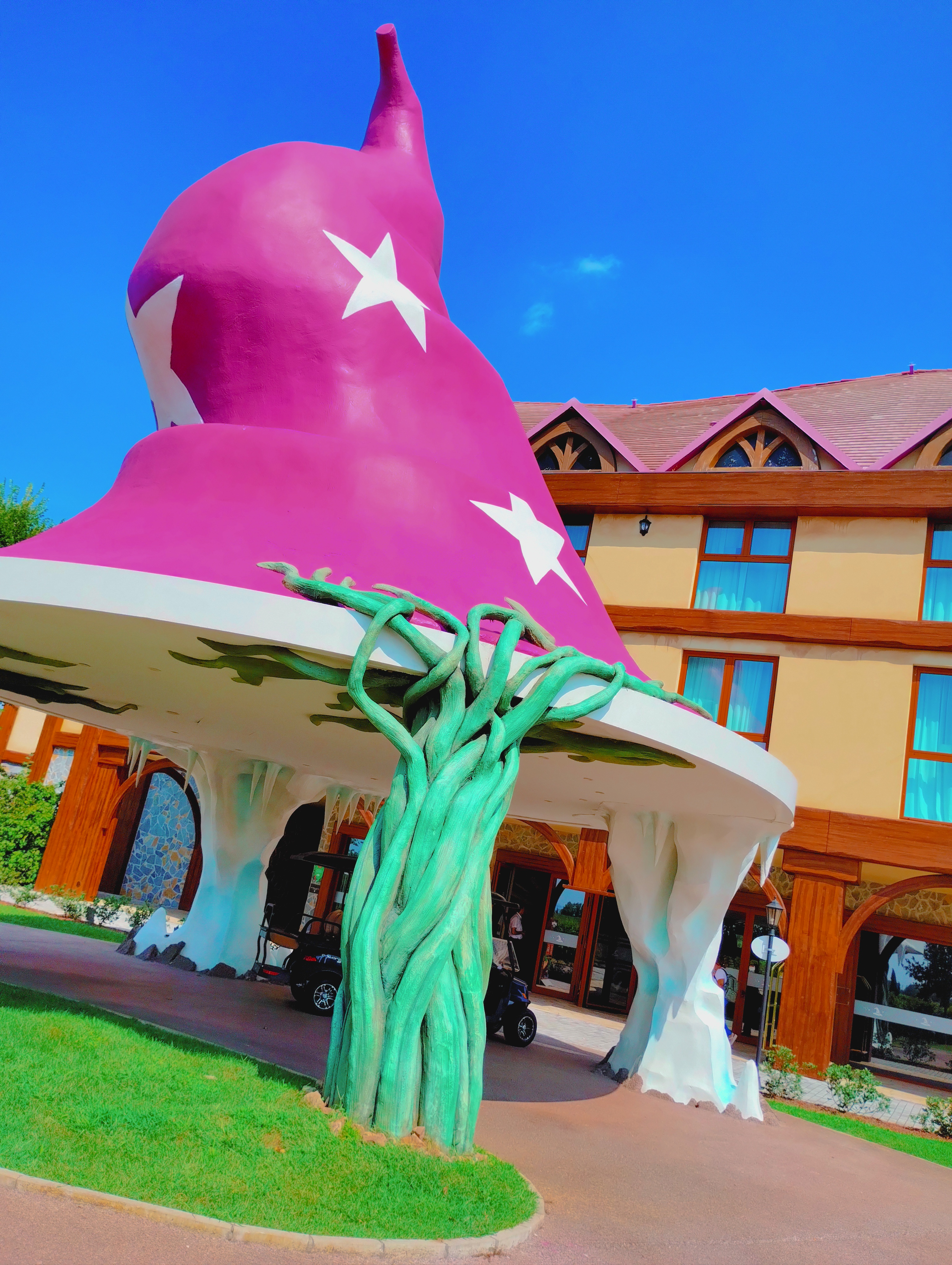
Gardaland Magic Hotel 2025

The third themed hotel opened in 2021. Gardaland Magic Hotel comprises 128 rooms with three themes: Enchanted Forest, Magic Ice Castle and Great Wizard. The four-star property was an investment of 20 million Euros and was designed around the concept of a magical enchanted kingdom.

== Themed areas ==
Name	Picture	Additional information
Fantasy Kingdom		Fantasy themed area featuring a variety of family rides.
Rio Bravo		Western themed street.
Dragon Empire		Formerly an area based on Kung Fu Panda with family rides, from 2025 it has been partially re-themed due to ending of DreamWorks license for the use of Kung Fu Panda brand. The rides in this area also changed name and partially got re-themed to eliminate any references to the franchise.
Peppa Pig Land		A small Peppa Pig themed area with younger rides just by the main entrance.
Prezzemolo Land		Medieval themed area featuring a variety of family rides, a restaurant & a playground.
Animal Treasure Island		Pirate themed area, representing a typical English Victorian Era village, that used to house the biggest Italian dark ride (I Corsari, opened in 1992). In 2025 this are has been partially rethought to better fit the new ride, Animal Treasure Island, that shares the same facility of I Corsari, but with some new updated pieces of scenery, new animatronics and more modern technological effects, besides a new story, which is a new and original intellectual property of Merlin.

== Attractions ==
=== Roller coasters ===
Name	Picture	Type	Opened	Area	Manufacturer	Additional information
Blue Tornado		Suspended Looping Coaster	1998	Adventure	Vekoma	The Vekoma SLC (765 m [2,510 ft] extended with helix) is situated near the entrance of the park, and stands 33.32 m (109 ft 4 in) tall from the ground. The track is 765 m (2,510 ft) long, and the main elements are a rollover, sidewinder and a double in-line twist ending with several high speed helices close to the ground. The minimum height restriction is 1.4 metres.
Shaman		Steel sit down coaster	1985	North America	Vekoma	Vekoma Double Loop Corkscrew, and is situated on the lower level of the park. The oldest coaster in the park, originally called Magic Mountain. It stands at 30 m (98 ft 5 in) above the ground and 700 m (2,296 ft 7 in) long. Its main elements are a double loop, double corkscrew and a rising helix. In 2009 the classic Arrow Dynamics trains have been replaced with the new model of Vekoma. The minimum height restriction is 1.2 metres. In the 2017 season the ride was rethemed and renamed as Shaman and featured a Virtual Reality experience. The VR was removed prior to the 2018 season.
Raptor		Wing Coaster	2011	Raptor	Bolliger & Mabillard	Raptor is the prototype Wing Coaster by Swiss manufacturer Bolliger & Mabillard. It opened on 1 April 2011. The minimum height restriction is 1.4 metres. It stands 33 m tall.
Mammut (Mammoth)		Steel sit down	2008	Adventure	Vekoma	Mammut (Italian for Mammoth) is a steel roller coaster which includes a statue of a mammoth. It features three lift hills with a maximum height of 14 m and is the longest coaster in the park.
Oblivion: The Black Hole		Dive Coaster	2015	Oblivion	Bolliger & Mabillard	Oblivion: The Black Hole opened on 28 March 2015 and is a dive coaster manufactured by Bolliger and Mabillard. It is based on the prototype dive coaster at Alton Towers which is called 'Oblivion'. The minimum height restriction is 1.4 metres. At a height of 42.5 m, is the tallest coaster in the park.
Dragon Rush		Steel spinning roller coaster	2016	Dragon Empire	Fabbri Group	Family spinning coaster from Fabbri. Opened on 14 May 2016 as part of the Kung Fu Panda Academy area. Rethemed for 2025, removing the Kung Fu Panda theme.
Ortobruco Tour		Steel	1990	Luna Park	Pinfari	Ortobruco Tour is a family caterpillar coaster from Pinfari and opened in 1990. Its track was extended in 1993.

=== Water rides ===
Name	Picture	Type	Opened	Area	Manufacturer	Additional information
Colorado Boat		Log flume	1985	North America	Mack Rides	Log flume themed to the Americas, featuring two drops with the tallest reaching 15 m.
Jungle Rapids		River rapids ride	1999	Adventure	Intamin	Rapids ride which passes by various Asian scenes.
Fuga da Atlantide (Escape from Atlantis)		Shoot the Chute	2003	Adventure	Intamin	Fuga da Atlantide, is a Shoot the Chute, the Intamin Super Splash, and is situated near Blue Tornado. The ride begins with a cable lift hill, then the car/boat turns on a shallow helix and plummets down a steep drop on a track with water jets into a pool. The ride progresses to another similar element. It features two drops, standing 16 m and 19 m tall.

=== Dark rides ===
Name	Picture	Type	Opened	Manufacturer	Additional information
Jumanji - The Adventure		Dark ride	2022	Oceaneering	A multi-motion dark ride, based on the Jumanji movie franchise. It replaced La Valle dei Re (1987) and Ramses: Il risveglio (2009) both dark rides were set in the Ancient Egypt.
Animal Treasure Island		Dark ride	2025	Intamin (transportation system)	A water dark ride featuring cartoonish characters in a pirate advnture. It replaced I Corsari (1992), keeping the same main scenery and the transportation system.

=== Flat thrill rides ===
Name	Picture	Type	Opened	Area	Manufacturer	Additional information
Space Vertigo		Drop Tower	1998	Oblivion	Intamin	A 40 m tall drop tower.
Magic House		Madhouse (ride)	2002	Fantasy Kingdom	Vekoma	A mad house built underground.

=== Family rides ===
Name	Picture	Type	Opened	Area	Manufacturer	Additional information
Flying Island		Flying Island	2000	Oblivion	Intamin	A 50 m tall observation tower offering panoramic views across the park and Lake Garda.
Baby Pilota (Baby Pilot)		Spinning ride	2000	Camelot	-	The planes rotate and move up and down. Originillay opened at Fantasy Kingdom in 2000, then relocated in the Camelot area. Now part of the small Baby Land area.
Wolf Legend		Drop’n Twist Tower	2024	North America	SBF Visa Group	Family based drop tower ride located on the site of the former Sequoia Magic Loop.
Peter Pan		Spinning ride	1986	Luna Park	Mack Rides	Fast spinning family ride.
Giostra Cavalli (Horse Carousel)		Carousel	1988	Camelot	C and S	Double-decker carousel.
Monorotaia (Monorail)		Monorail	1989	Luna Park	Mack Rides	Monorail with views across the bottom section of the park.
Rocket Factory		Teacups	1988	Dragon Empire	Mack Rides	Formerly known as Kaffetassen. Rethemed in 2016 as part of the Kung Fu Panda Academy area and renamed Mr. Ping's Noodle Surprise. Rethemed again in 2025 removing the Fung Fu Panda theme.
Il Trenino di Nonno Pig (The Little Train of Grandpa Pig)		Junior train ride	2018	Peppa Pig Land	I.E Park	Children's train ride.
La Mongolfiera di Peppa Pig (The Balloon of Peppa Pig)		Balloon ride	2018	Peppa Pig Land	I.E Park	Balloon ride with scenic views.
L'Isola dei Pirati (The Pirates' Island)		Junior boat ride	2018	Peppa Pig Land	I.E Park	Spinning boat ride.
La Casa di Peppa Pig (The House of Peppa Pig)		Walk-through attraction	2018	Peppa Pig Land		A walkthrough where you go through Peppa Pig's house.
Jumanji - The Labyrinth		Mirror walk-through maze	2023	Jumanji		A walkthrough mirror labyrinth attraction themed to Jumanji.
4D Cinema		4D theatre	2007	-		A 4D theatre that shows one or two videos during every season. It previously screened videos based on SpongeBob Squarepants, Ice Age, San Andreas, Wonder Woman, Aquaman and the Looney Tunes.
L'Albero di Prezzemolo (The Tree of Prezzemolo)		Walk-through attraction	2002	Fantasy Kingdom		An attraction that takes you inside the house of park's mascotte.
TransGardaland Express		Train ride	1975	Camelot	C&S	A panoramic tour on a train that, at its opening, enclosed all the park's attractions. It is the only attraction still standing from the opening day.
Volaplano		Monorail	2001	Fantasy Kingdom	Sbf Visa	A monorail with vehicles shapes like cartoonish airplanes that takes you around the area of Fantasy Kingdom.
Prezzemolo Land		Water playground	2014	Camelot		A playground featuring water fountains, only for kids below 1,4 m.
Prezzemolo Magic Village		Playground	2015	Camelot		A playground.
Doremifarm		Car ride	2001	Fantasy Kingdom		An attraction that takes you through a farm on a tractor.
Funny Express		Train ride	2001	Fantasy Kingdom		A small train ride for kids.
Baby Corsaro (Baby Corsair)		Ferris wheel	2000	Camelot		A small ferris wheel with cabins themed to pirate ships. Originillay opened at Fantasy Kingdom in 2000, then relocated in the Camelot area. Now part of the small Baby Land area.
Baby Cavalli (Baby Horses)		Spinning ride	2000	Camelot		A western-themed spinning ride. Originillay operating at Fantasy Kingdom briefly in 2000, then re-opened in 2012. Now part of the small Baby Land area.
Baby Canoe (Baby Canoes)		Spinning ride	2000	Camelot		A jungle-themed spinning ride. Originillay operating at Fantasy Kingdom briefly in 2000, then re-opened in 2012. Now part of the small Baby Land area.
Superbaby		Carousel	1989	Luna Park	Fabbri Group	A carousel for kids featuring animals and vehicles.

=== Other attractions ===
Name	Picture	Type	Opened	Area	Manufacturer	Additional information
Sea Life Aquarium		Aquarium	2008	-	Sea Life	Located outside the park at the back of the car park.
Gardaland Theatre		Theatre	2006	-		Theatre that houses various shows over the years.
Legoland Waterpark		Waterpark	2021	-		A waterpark themed around Lego that also features a Miniland.

=== Former attractions ===
Name	Picture	Type	Opened	Closed	Area	Manufacturer	Additional information
Sequoia Magic Loop		Steel roller coaster	2005	2019	North America	S&S	A "Screaming Squirrel" coaster originally called Sequoia Adventure. After a blackout in 2017 the attraction briefly reopened in 2019 as Sequoia Magic Loop before closing due to the Covid-19 pandemic. It was standing but not operating in 2022, then removed.
Rodeo		Spinning ride	1975	1979	Rio Bravo		A spinning ride featuring real horses tied to a rotating system.
Mini-Treno West (Little West Train)		Train ride	1975	1983	Rio Bravo		A small western-themed train ride.
Giostra Cavalli (Horse Carousel)		Caruosel	1975	1987	Camelot		A small carousel, removed to make place for the new ride with the same name.
Labirinto Giapponese (Japanese Labyrinth)		Maze	1975	1987	-		A Japanese-themed plant maze.
Parco Giochi (Playground)		Playground	1975	1987	-		A playground featuring tall spiral slides.
Villaggio a fumetti (Comics Village)		Car ride	1975	1989	-		A ride on board of old cars through a village populated by comic characters.
UFO (Centrifuge)		Centrifuge	1975	1992	Space Lake		A space-themed centrifuge ride, replaced by a newer model in 1993.
Tunga - The Apeman		Boat ride	1975	2010	Adventure		A boat ride set through the African jungle. Originally opened as Safari Africano (African Safari), then refurbished in 1999 and replaced by Raptor in 2011.
Canyons		Car ride	1975	2007	Rio Bravo		A small ride on mine carts. It closed in 2007, before being demolished in 2009.
Crazy House		Walk-through	1979	1982	-		A walk-through fun house.
Asterline Saturno 7 (Asterline Saturn 7)		Simulator	1979	1988	Space Lake		A moving space simulator shaped like a rocket with a 3D video showing inside. It was replaced by a newer model in 1989.
Zyklon		Jet coaster	1980	1984	-		The first roller coaster of the park.
Panoramic Tour		Cable ride	1982	2005	Rio Bravo		A cable ride above the park. Removed to make place for the Gardaland Theater.
Castello del Conte Dracula (Count Dracula's Castle)		Walk-through	1983	1994	Camelot		A walk-through horror house set inside Dracula's castle.
Prezzemolo Tour		Steel roller coaster	1986	1989	Luna Park		A small roller coaster for kids and the first ride featuring the park's mascotte Prezzemolo.
Cinema 3D		3D theatre	1986	1992	Luna Park		A 3D theater located inside a temporary pavillion.
Ruota Panoramica (Ferris Wheel)		Ferris wheel	1986	1992	Luna Park		A ferris wheel with 16 cabins. It closed after many people where injured after an accident.
Il Corpo di Eva (The Body of Eve)		Walk-through	1988	1993	Luna Park		An educational walk-through set inside the body of a giant woman, representing Eve, teaching the kids about human anatomy.
La Valle dei Re (The Valley of the Kings)		Dark ride	1988	2008	Egyptian-Arabian		An egyptian themed underground dark ride, built inside a copy of the Ramses II temple.
Calci (Kicks)		Swing ride	1988	1994	Luna Park		A swing ride, closed after a non-fatal incident.
Nuvola (Cloud)		Flying carpet	1989	2001	Luna Park		A flying carpet ride.
Ikarus		Condor ride	1989	2011	-		A 25 m tall Condor ride.
Villaggio degli Elfi (Elves' Village)		Car ride	1990	1999	-		A re-themed version of Villaggio a Fumetti featuring cartoonish elves.
The Spectacular 4D Adventure		Motion theatre	1990	2016	-		An underground motion theater, originally called Cinema Dinamico (Dinamic Theater). It was rethemed in 2001 and renamed L'Isola dei Dinosauri (The Dinosaurs' Island). It was renamed again in 2004 and to the dinosaurs theme were added a western theme and a jungle theme.
I Corsari (The Corsairs)		Dark ride	1992	2024	Tudor Village		An underground pirate-themed dark ride featuring a lot of animatronics and amazing sceneries. There were added projections in 2018 and it was renamed I Corsari - La Vendetta del Fantasma (The Corsairs - The Revenge of the Ghost). It was rethemed in 2025 to Animal Treasure Island.
Moonraker		Centrifuge	1993	1999	Space Lake		A centrifuge ride that replaced the old UFO.
Top Spin		Top spin	1993	2014	Luna Park		A top spin ride.
Il Mondo di Barbie (The World of Barbie)		Exhibition	1995	1996	-		A pink pavillion showcasing an exhibition of Barbie.
Space Lab		Space simulator	1995	1999	Space Lake		A space simulator that replaced Asterline Saturno 7.
Baby Carousel		Kids rides	1995	1999	Luna Park		A collection of four kids rides.
Castello di Mago Merlino (Wizard Merlin's Castle)		Animatronics show	1995	2001	Camelot		An audio-animatronic show set inside Merlin's workshop.
Saltomatto (Madjump)		Mini drop tower	2001	2018	Fantasy Kingdom		A small drop tower for kids.
Ramses: Il Risveglio (Ramses: The Awakening)		Shooting dark ride	2009	2019	Egyptian-Arabian		A rethemed version of La Valle dei Re, featuring an interactive shooting system.
Inferis		Walk-through	2010	2011	-		A walk-through horror house with live-action actors set inside an abandoned factory.
Prezzemolo's Labyrinth		Maze	2011	2014	Camelot		A small plant maze.
Foresta Incantata (Enchanted Forest)		Walk-through	2019	2019	Rio Bravo		A short-lived walk-through attraction through an enchanted forest.

== Attendance ==
The park was a success in its first year, receiving approximately 100,000 visitors and a revenue of almost 140 million lire.

In 2015, Gardaland reported a record year in volume and growth. Two thirds of visitors were families with children and one third (33%) were "thrill seekers" aged 15 to 25. A third of all visitors were international. The park's growth had been the result of its strategy to attract international visitors who were staying at Lake Garda by working with local hotels and campsites. Visitor numbers were also boosted by the Oblivion coaster. The park achieved an 11.5% rise in visitors from 2,600,000 in 2017 to 2,900,000 in 2018, driven by the addition of Peppa Pig. In 2024, Gardaland was listed as the eighth most popular theme park in Europe, having received 2,950,000 visitors in a year. It was twice as popular as Mirabilandia in visitor numbers. In 2026, the park ranked as the seventh most popular theme park in Europe, with 3 million visitors.

== Gallery ==
=== Food and features ===
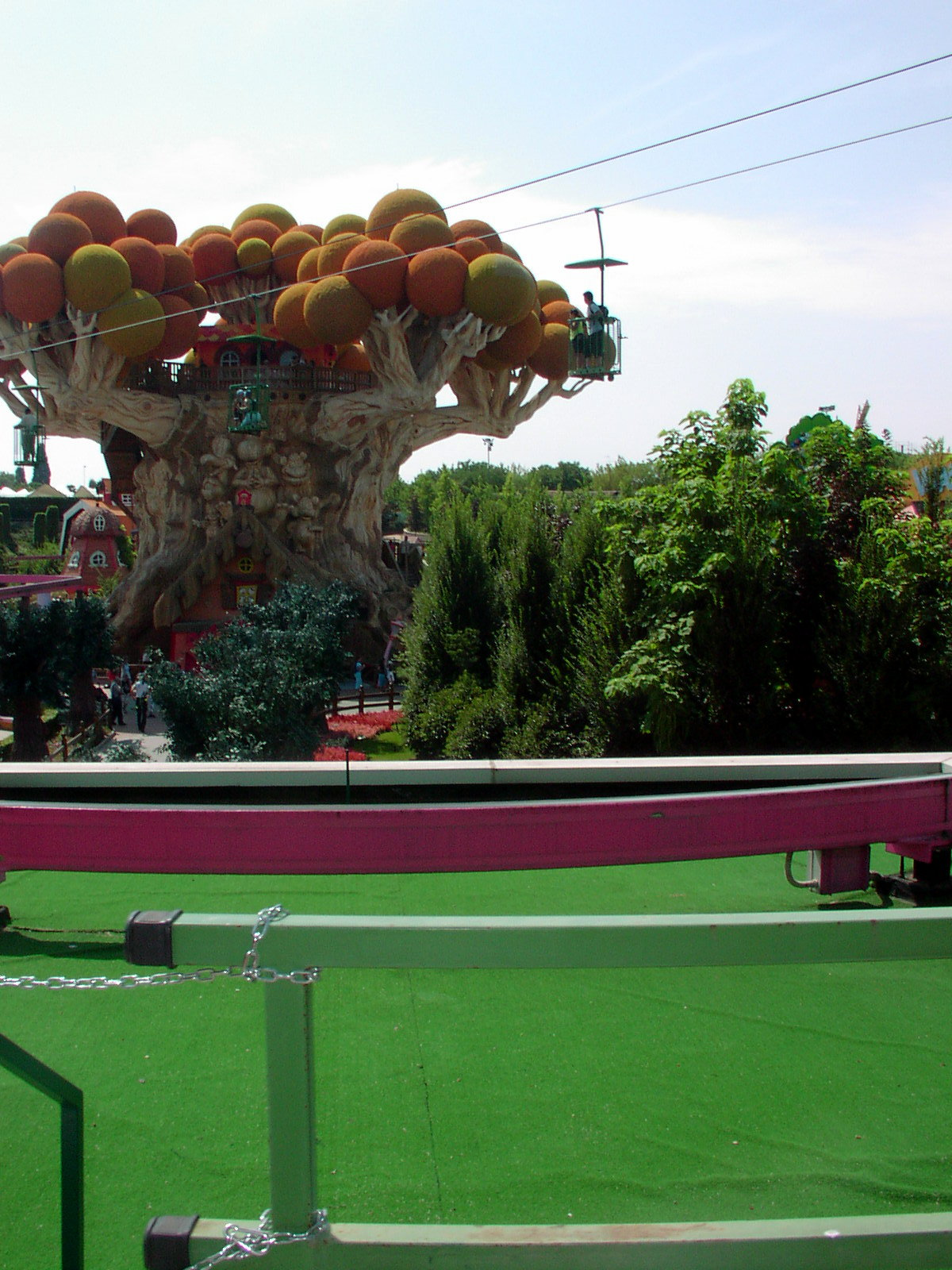
Fantasy Kingdom

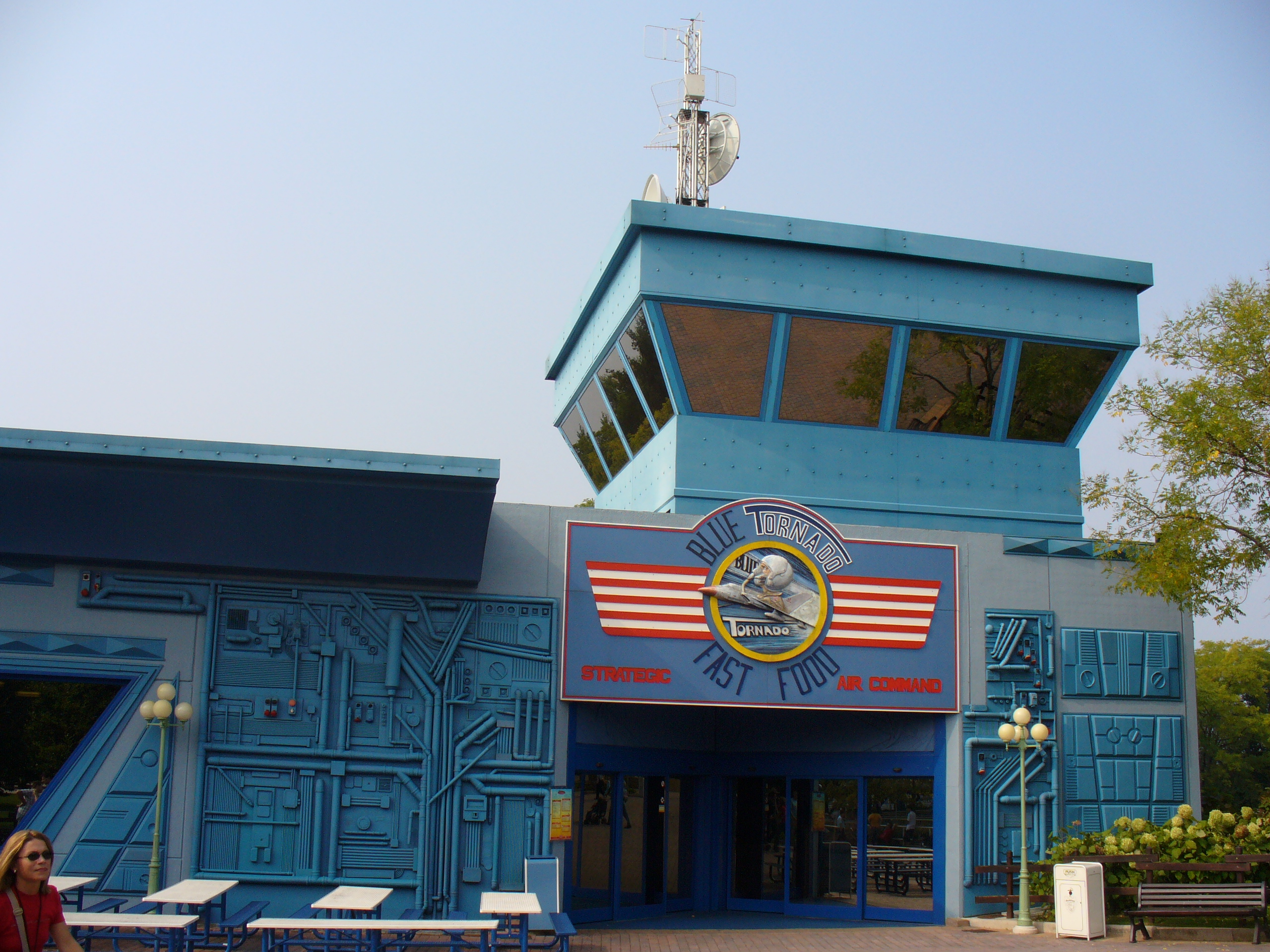
Fast Food Blue Tornado

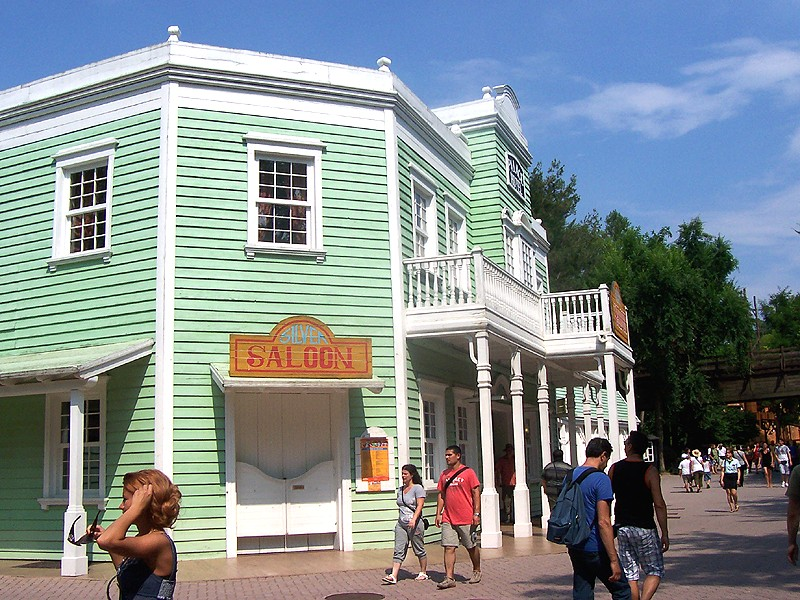
Pizzeria Saloon

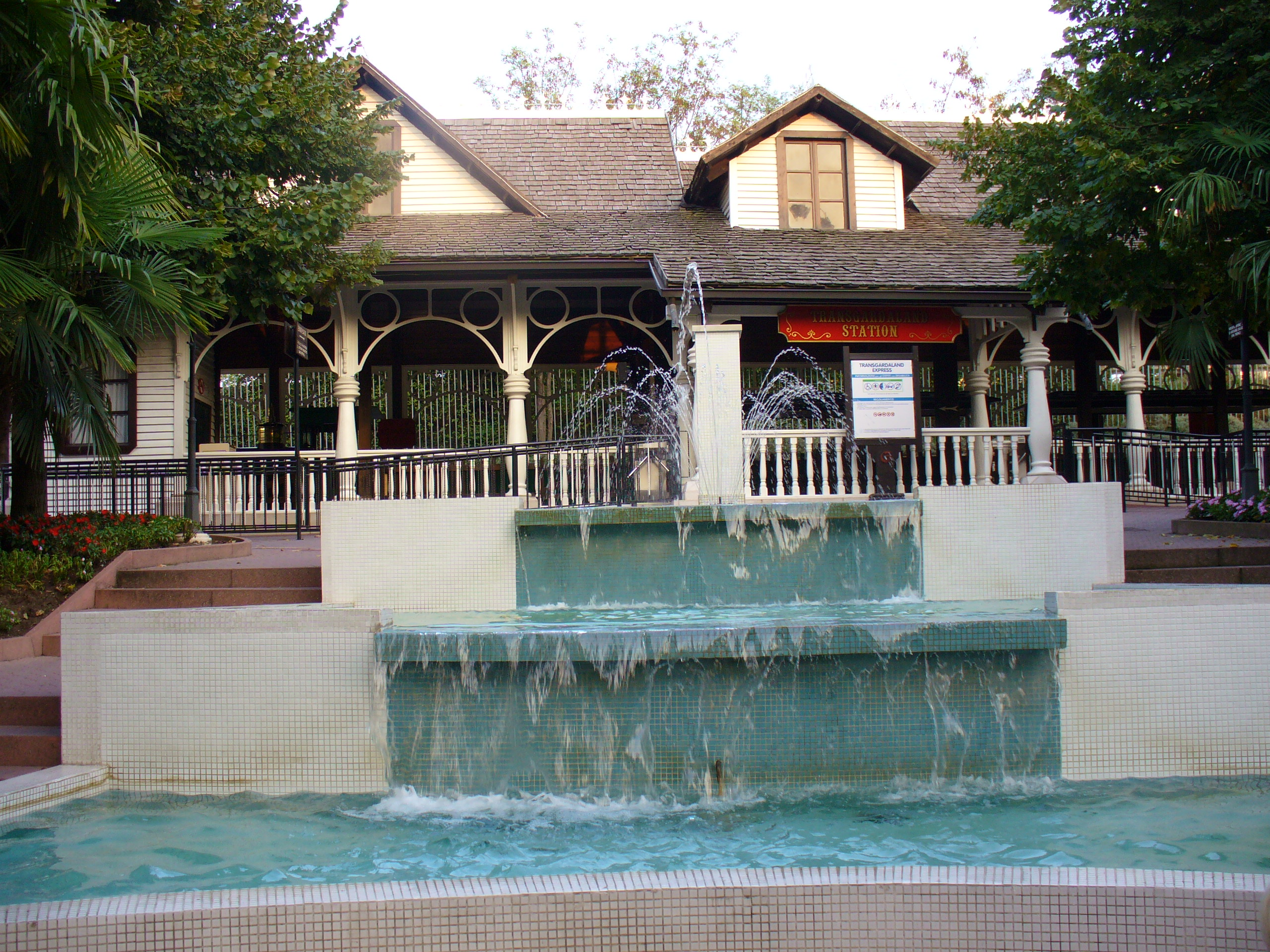
Transgardaland Express

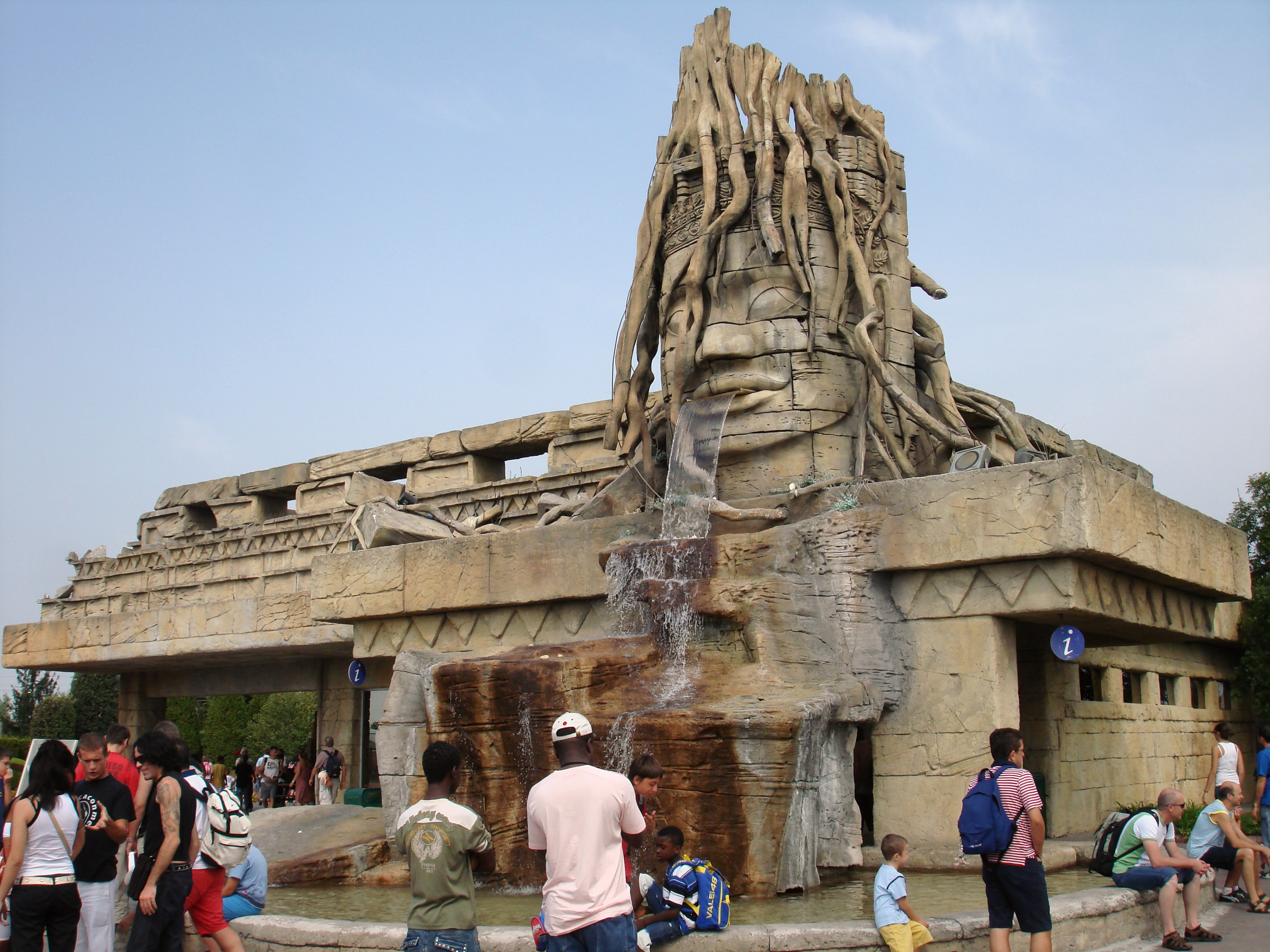
Information centre outside the park
