= Blue Tornado (roller coaster) =

Steel rollercoaster at Gardaland

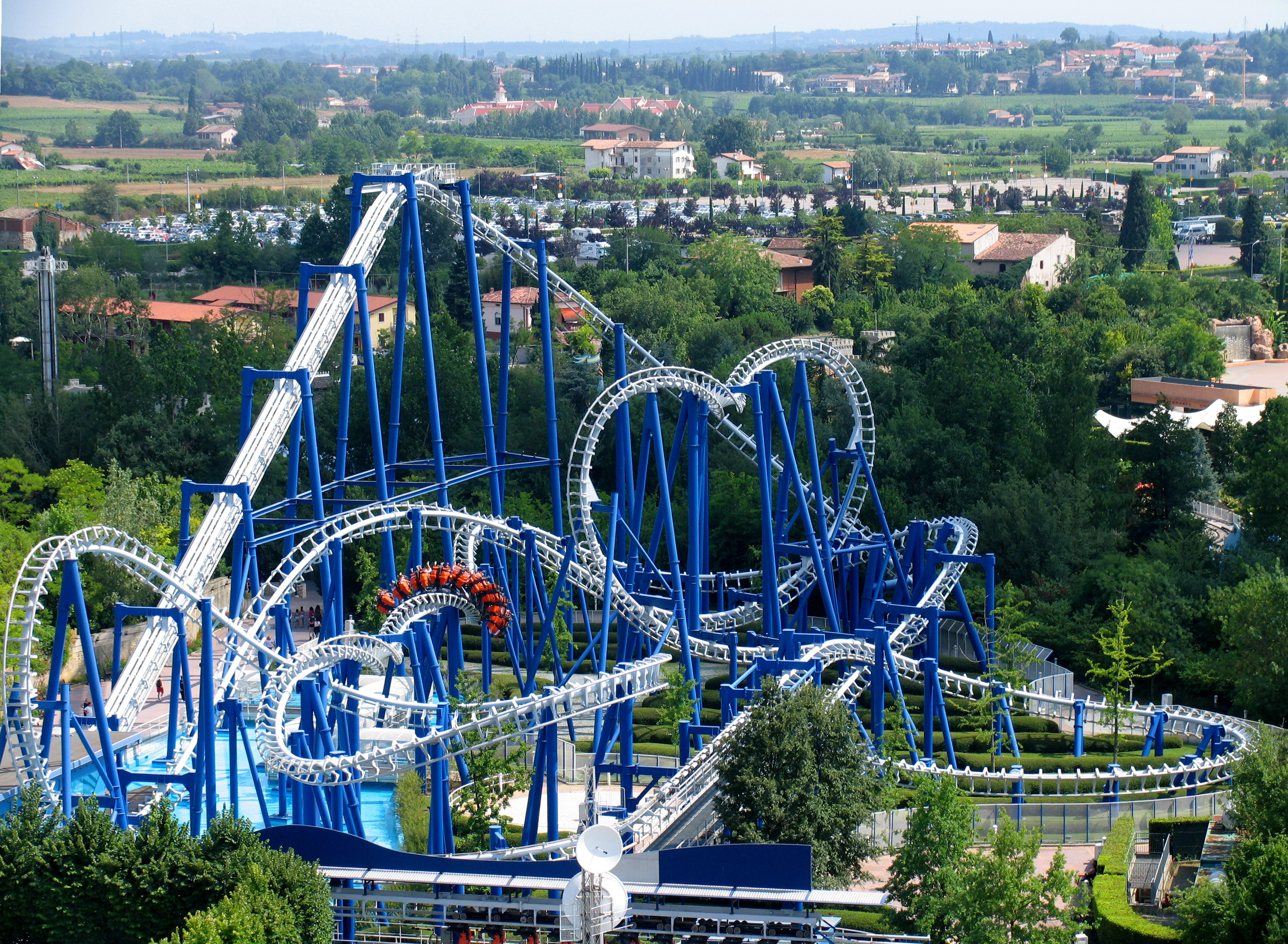
- The ride photo taken from Flying Island.

Gardaland
- Location: Gardaland
- Coordinates: 45.456601°N 10.713660°E
- Status: Operating
- Opening date: 1998

General statistics
- Type: Steel – Inverted
- Manufacturer: Vekoma
- Designer: Vekoma
- Model: Suspended Looping Coaster (765m Extended w/ Helix)
- Height: 108.27 ft (33.00 m)
- Drop: 98.43 ft (30.00 m)
- Length: 2,509 ft (765 m)
- Speed: 49.7 mph (80.0 km/h)
- Inversions: 5
- Duration: 1 min 42 sec
- Max vertical angle: 59°
- Capacity: 1500 riders per hour
- G-force: 4.5
- Height restriction: 55–78.75 in (140–200 cm)
- Trains: 3 trains with 10 cars. Riders are arranged 2 across in a single row for a total of 20 riders per train.
- Blue Tornado at RCDB

Blue Tornado is an inverted roller coaster at Gardaland, Castelnuovo del Garda, outside Verona, Italy. It is an extended standard model, with additional helix, of the Suspended Looping Coaster manufactured by Vekoma. The ride's highest force is at 4.5G's during the sidewinder inversion. A model Panavia Tornado fighter jet is seen on top of the station for decorative purposes.

== Accidents and incidents ==
In August 1999, a 17-year-old boy from Treviso, Italy died of a heart attack while riding the roller coaster. It was later proven that the boy suffered a life threatening heart disease.

On May 10, 2001, a 15-year-old boy from Germany also died of a heart attack while on the ride. The 15-year-old suffered from a lifelong heart condition and according to reports, ignored advice from friends and signs not to board the ride if suffering from a heart condition.
