= Legoland Water Park (Gardaland) =

Waterpark in north-eastern Italy

Coordinates: 45°27′19″N 10°42′43″E

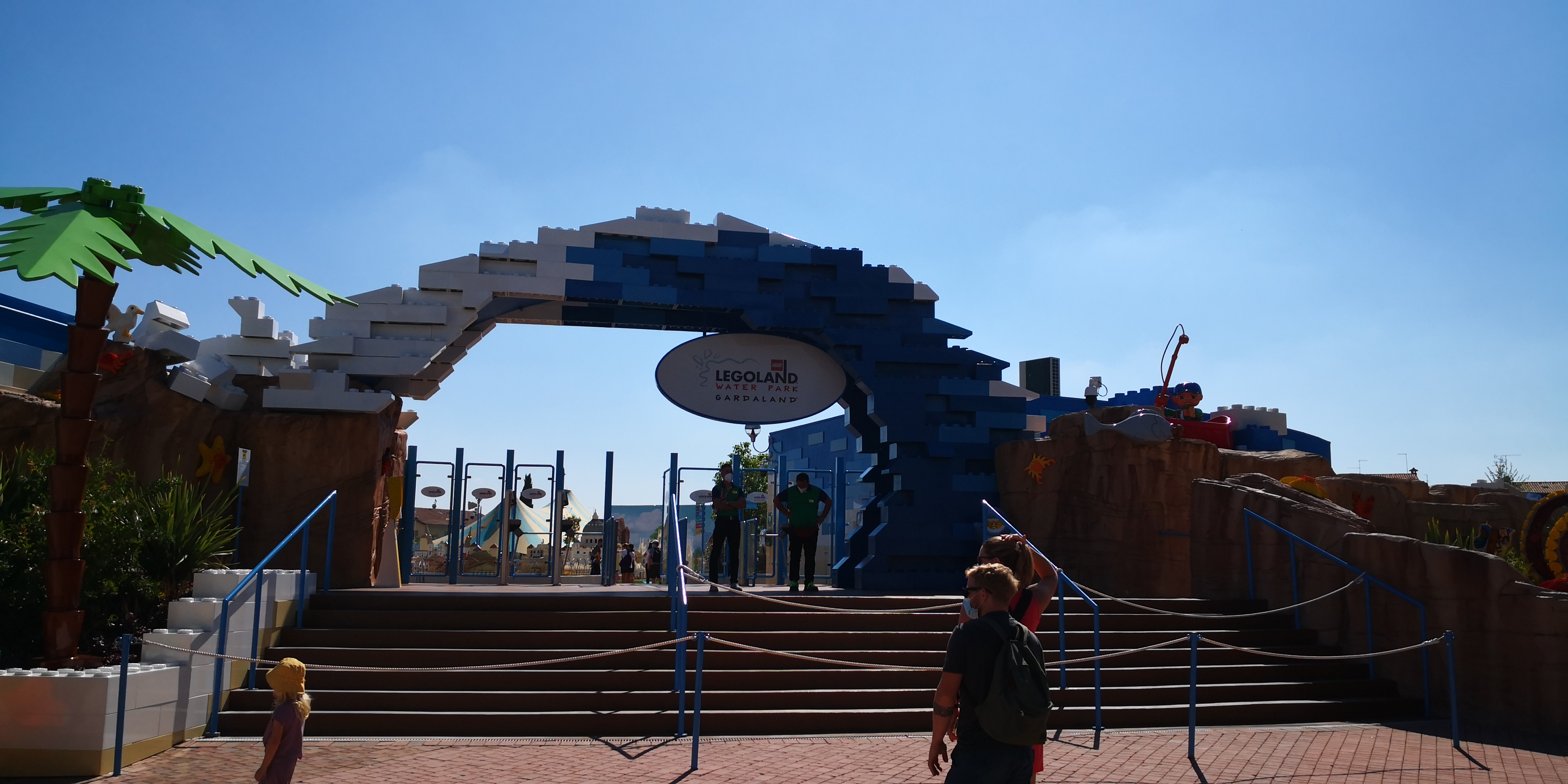
Entrance to Legoland Water Park, 2021

Legoland Water Park Gardaland is a waterpark in Italy. It is located at the Gardaland theme park and can only be accessed via the theme park. The park was originally scheduled to open in 2020 but due to the COVID-19 pandemic, it was postponed to Summer of 2021.

Legoland Water Park opened in the summer of 2021 inside the Gardaland theme park.
