= Castelnuovo del Garda =

- Comune
- Comune di Castelnuovo del Garda
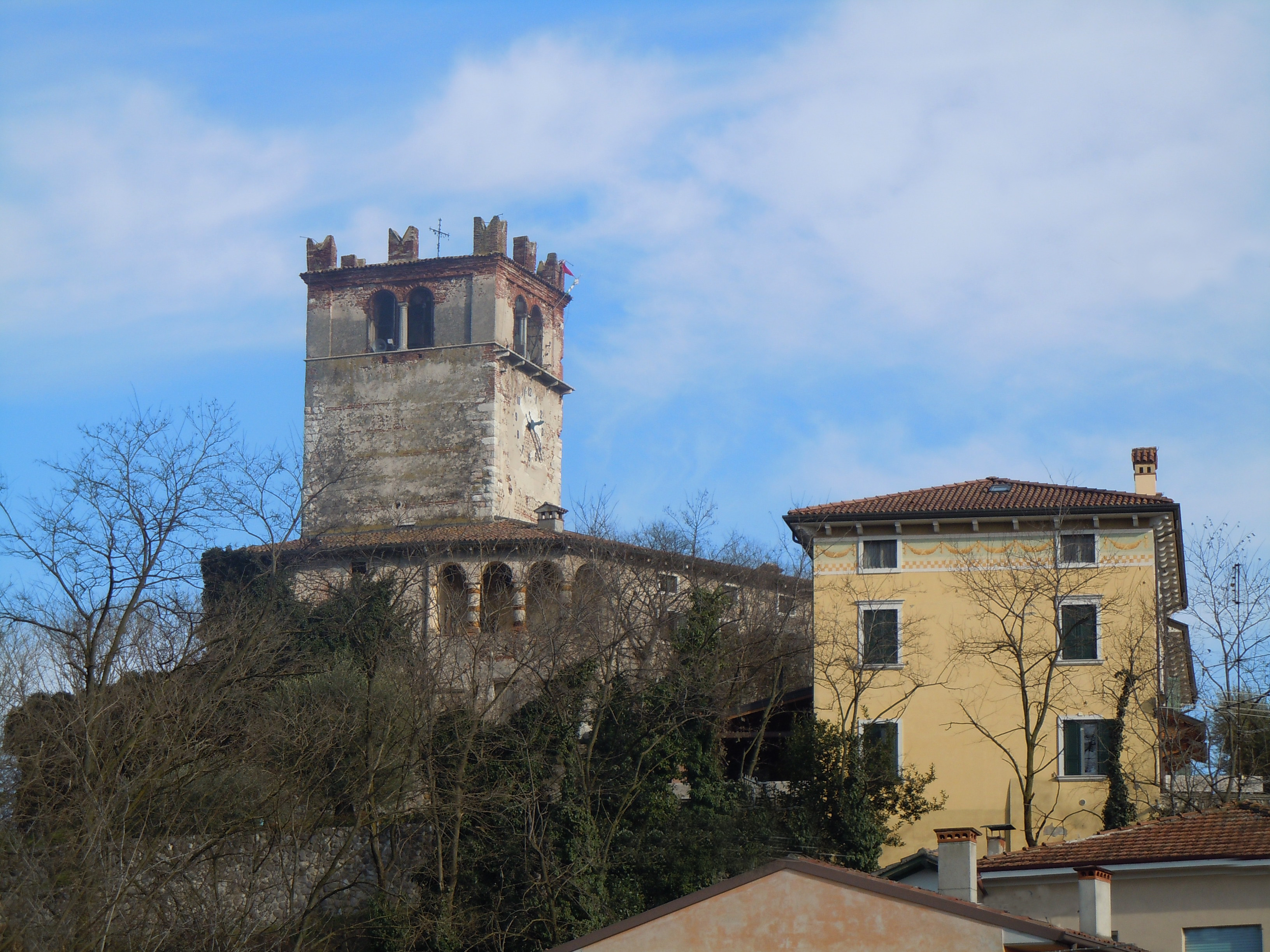
- Castelnuovo del Garda

- Coat of arms

- Location within Italy Location within Veneto
- Coordinates: 45°26′N 10°46′E
- Country: Italy
- Region: Veneto
- Province: Verona (VR)
- Frazioni: Oliosi, Sandrà, Cavalcaselle

Government
  - Mayor: Giovanni Peretti (Casa dei cittadini)

Area
  - Total: 34.7 km^{2} (13.4 sq mi)
- Elevation: 130 m (430 ft)

Population (28 February 2010)
  - Total: 12,469
  - Density: 359/km^{2} (931/sq mi)
- Demonym: Castelnovesi
- Time zone: UTC+1 (CET)
  - Summer (DST): UTC+2 (CEST)
- Postal code: 37014
- Dialing code: +39 045
- Patron saint: Santa Maria Nascente
- Website: Official website

Castelnuovo del Garda is an Italian comune (municipality), in the Province of Verona, in Veneto, on a couple of morainic hills a few kilometres south-east of Lake Garda. Verona is about 20 km to the east, Venice is 140 km east and Milan 140 km west.

Castelnuovo del Garda has a short beach on the lake, between the municipalities of Peschiera del Garda and Lazise. The comune borders the municipalities of Bussolengo, Lazise, Peschiera del Garda, Sona, and Valeggio sul Mincio.

Gardaland, the biggest amusement park in Italy, is expanding mainly within the Castelnuovo municipality, close to Lake Garda shores.

== History ==
From a few archaeological remains found on the top of the main hill (called Monte Alto), probably Castelnuovo del Garda was already inhabited during the prehistoric age.

During the Roman period, it was first known as Beneventum, and was later renamed Quadrivium which literally means 4 roads, or crossroad. Indeed, its location was strategical being at the crossroad between the Via Gallica (which was connecting the modern Torino with the modern Venezia passing by Milan, the actual SS11), and a connection with the Via Claudia Augusta (which was connecting central Italy with Austria passing by the Val d'Adige and the Alps).

In the 12th century, Quadrivium was destroyed by Frederick Barbarossa. Consequently, rebuilt as a fortified town, Quadrivium was renamed Castrum Novum (which means New Castle), and the name has remained unchanged with the Italian version Castelnuovo.

During the centuries, Castelnuovo passed under different political controls, from the Lord of Verona (Signoria degli Scaligeri), the Lord of Milano (Signoria dei Visconti), the Venetian Republic, the Austrian empire (see the next chapter for the "Castelnuovo massacre"), and eventually becoming part of the Regno d'Italia with the third Italian independence war and the consequential Armistice of Cormons, in the 1866.

Only in 1970, Castelnuovo took its actual name, Castelnuovo del Garda, to highlight its location close to the Lake Garda shores.

== The Castelnuovo Massacre – 11 April 1848 ==
On 11 April 1848, Castelnuovo del Garda was almost totally destroyed and burned (including the church and the medieval tower) by the Austrian Empire army, during the first Italian independence war. That day, 400 men of the Corpo Volontari Lombardi fought against 3,000 Austrian soldiers, which consequentially burned the city, killing around 89 local citizens (46 of them women and children) as reprisal for the revolutionary actions that were taking place in the region.

The Austrian army was headed by the field marshal Joseph Radetzky, who was serving in Verona, and the commander Whillerm Thurn. The Italian Volontari had been sent by Major Luciano Manara and commanded by Agostino Noaro.

== Main Historical Sites ==
- The tower of Castelnuovo, built by the Lord of Milano – 14th century
- Church of the Madonna degli Angeli – 15th century
- Church of S.Maria Nascente – 18th century
- Villa Cossali Sella – 15th century
- Villa Arvedi D'Emilei – 17th century
- Villa Negri – 17th century

== Culture ==
=== Events ===
- Festa dell'uva (wine festival), the most important event in Castelnuovo del Garda is the wine festival that takes place every year at the end of the summer, usually a weekend in mid-September. It is a celebration of the historically most important economic sector of the region: the wine production. During the festival, several local producers present their wine and participate in a competition for the best wine of the year. In addition, several cultural and historical exhibitions are taking place during the whole weekend.
- Festa della Bandiera (the flag celebration). The third Sunday of June, the municipality celebrates an event that occurred on 24 June 1866, during the third Italian independence war. In the specific, in the municipality district Oliosi, a group of soldiers remained surrounded by the enemy and decided to divide the flag between each other in order to avoid giving it to the enemy.

== Media ==
File:Map_of_comune_of_Castelnuovo_del_Garda_(province_of_Verona,_region_Veneto,_Italy).svgMunicipality map of Castelnuovo del Garda

== Twin towns ==
- Neustadt an der Aisch, Germany, since 1988
- Trebnje, Slovenia, since 2001
