= 2017 in amusement parks =

This is a list of events and openings related to amusement parks that occurred in 2017. These various lists are not exhaustive.

== Amusement parks ==
=== Opening ===
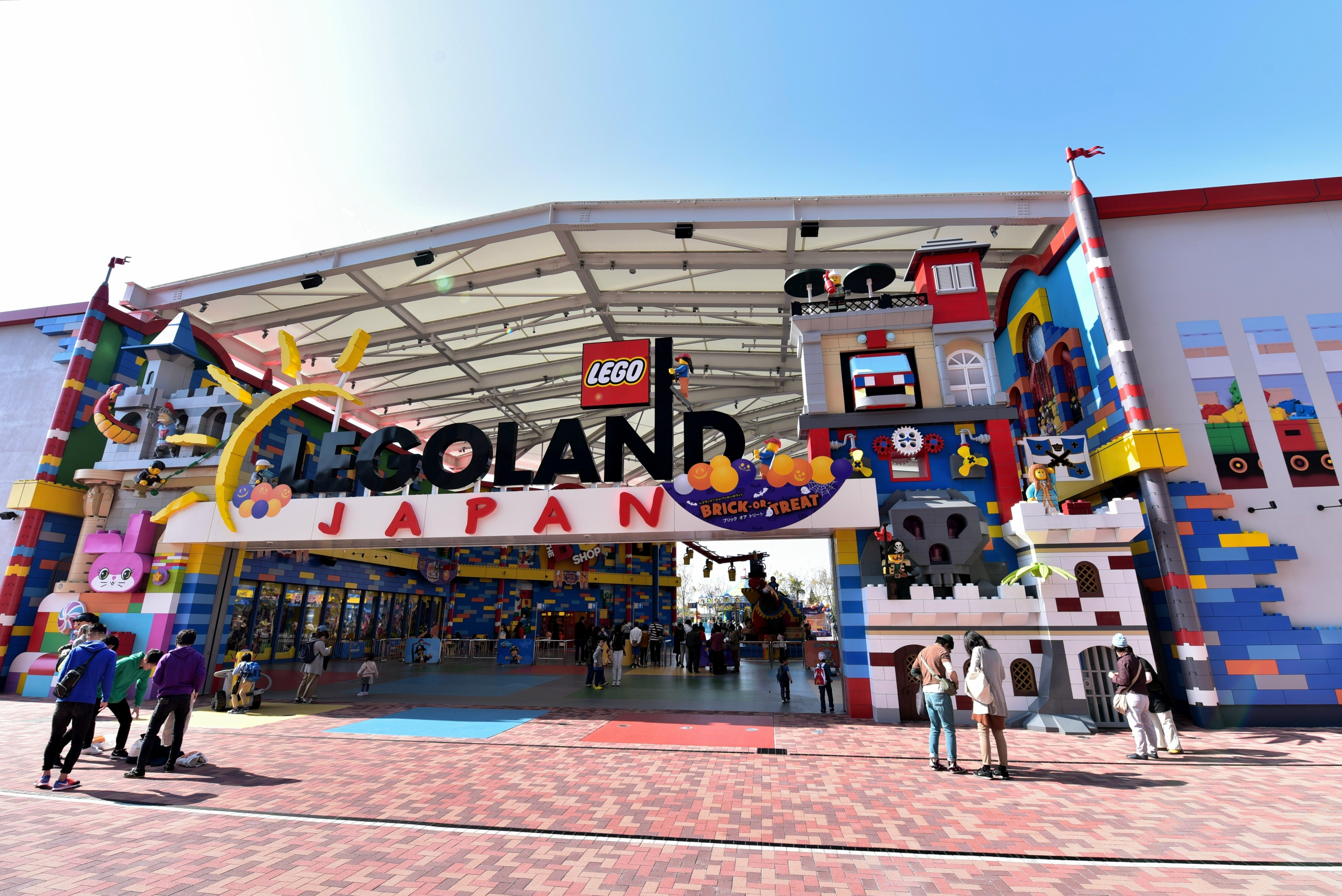
Legoland Japan opened in April.

- Malaysia Movie Animation Park Studios – June 26
- Spain Ferrari Land – April 7
- United States Volcano Bay – May 25
- United States Park at OWA – July 21
- Japan Legoland Japan – April 1
- Indonesia Jawa Timur Park 3 – December 11
- Belgium Comic Station Antwerp

=== Change of ownership ===
- Six Flags Hurricane Harbor Concord – Premier Parks » Six Flags

=== Birthday ===
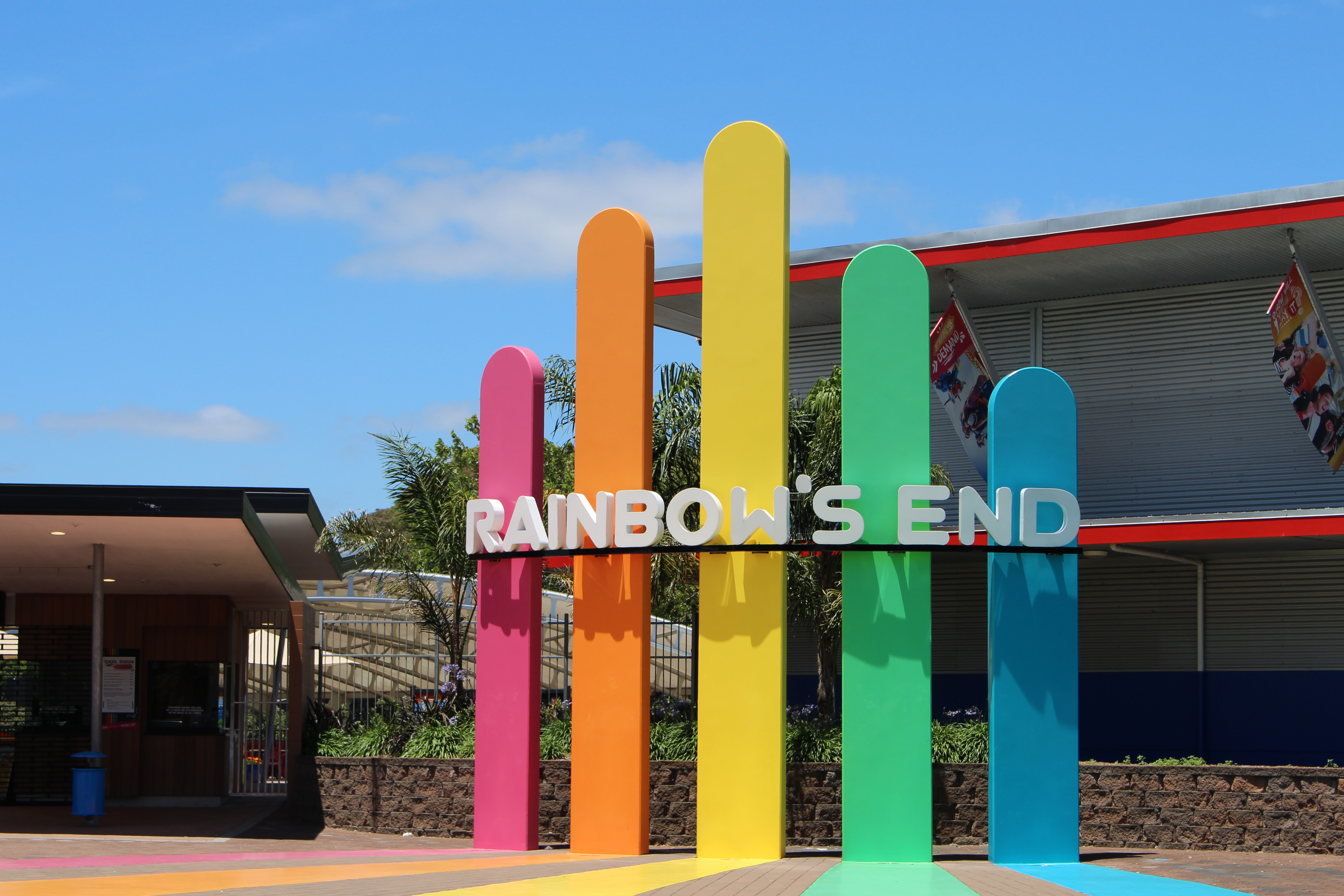
Rainbow's End celebrates its 35th anniversary in December.

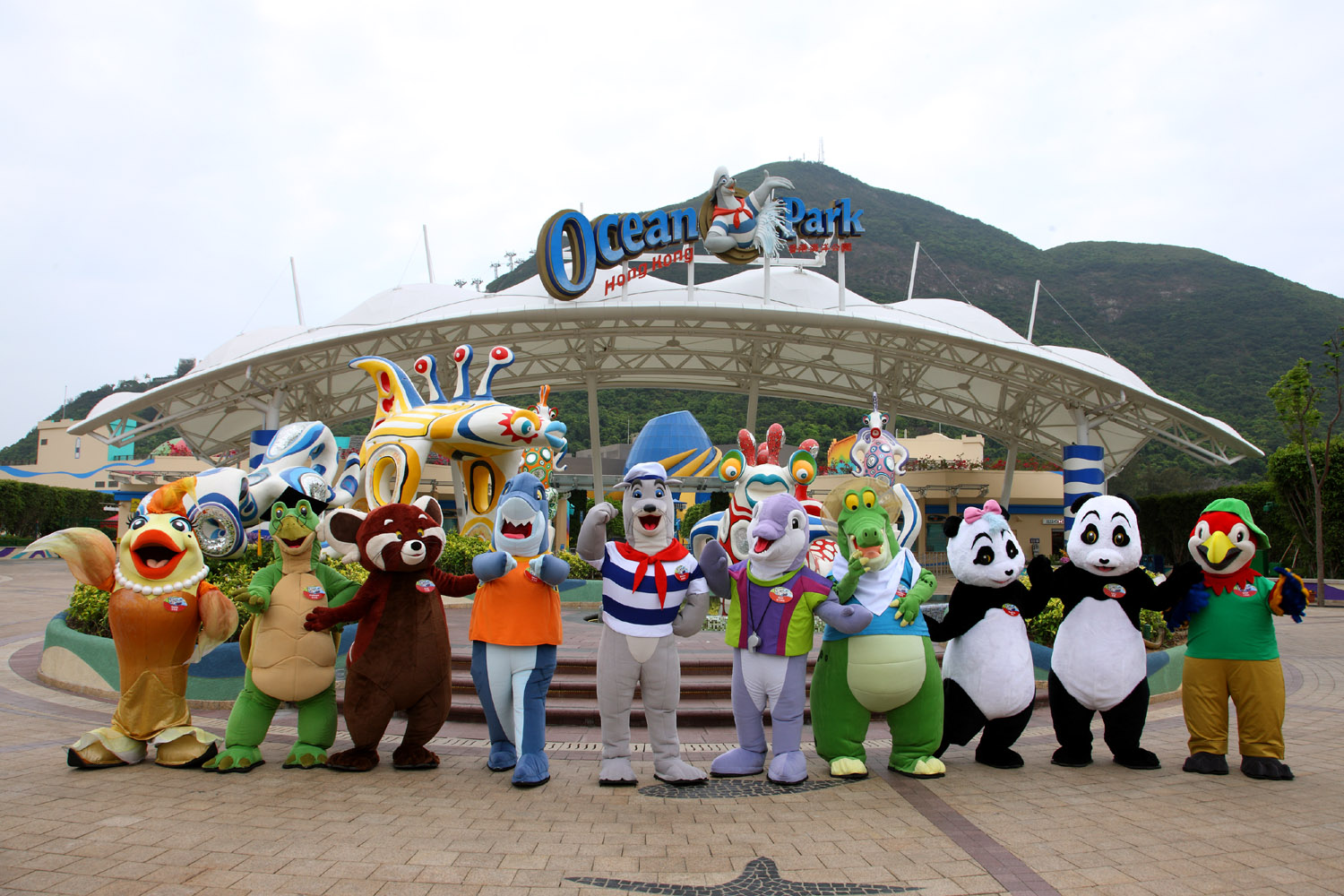
Ocean Park Hong Kong celebrated its 40th anniversary in January.

- United States Adventureland (New York) - 55th birthday
- Germany Phantasialand – 50th birthday
- United States Epcot – 35th birthday
- France Disneyland Paris – 25th birthday
- England Chessington World of Adventures – 30th birthday
- United States Kentucky Kingdom - 30th birthday
- United States Kings Island – 45th birthday
- New Zealand Rainbow's End - 35th birthday
- United States Six Flags Fiesta Texas – 25th birthday
- United States Six Flags Over Georgia – 50th birthday
- France Walt Disney Studios Park – 15th birthday
- Canada La Ronde – 50th birthday
- Australia Luna Park Melbourne – 105th birthday
- Italy Mirabilandia – 25th birthday
- France Futuroscope – 30th birthday
- Netherlands Efteling – 65th birthday
- Hong Kong, China Ocean Park Hong Kong – 40th birthday
- United States Wild Waves Theme Park - 40th birthday

=== Closed ===
- Space World – December 31
- Sega Republic – June 1
- Boomers! Fresno – September 4

== Additions ==
=== Roller coasters ===
==== New ====
Name	Park	Type	Manufacturer	Opened	Ref(s)
Alien	Fun Park Biograd	Wild Mouse roller coaster	Beijing Jiuhua Amusement Rides Manufacturing Co.	July 15	
Arashi	Nagashima Spa Land	4th Dimension roller coaster	S&S Worldwide	March 10	
Boomerang	Energylandia	Boomerang roller coaster	Vekoma	April 29	
Boomerang Roller Coaster	Wuhan Zhongshan Park	Steel roller coaster	Hebei Zhongye Metallurgical Equipment Manufacturing	May 23	
Capitol Bullet Train	Motiongate Dubai	Launched roller coaster	Mack Rides	October 20	
Children Walker Car	Visionland	Steel roller coaster	Golden Horse	July 6	
Circus Coaster	Energylandia	Junior roller coaster	SBF Visa Group	April 17	
Crazy Mouse	Park at OWA	Spinning roller coaster	Zamperla	July 21	
Crazy Skateboard	Beijing Shijingshan Amusement Park	Steel roller coaster	Beijing Jiuhua Amusement Rides Manufacturing Co.	2017	
Crazy Skaters	Shengming Universal City	Steel roller coaster	Beijing Jiuhua Amusement Rides Manufacturing Co.	September 27	
Dawson Duel	Bellewaerde	Summer toboggan	Wiegand	May 5	
DC Rivals HyperCoaster	Warner Bros. Movie World	Hypercoaster	Mack Rides	September 22	
Drachenwirbel	Freizeitpark Plohn	Spinning roller coaster	SBF Visa Group	April 14	
DrageKongen	Djurs Sommerland	Suspended roller coaster	Intamin	May 6	
Dragon Coaster	Legoland Japan	Steel roller coaster	Zierer	April 1	
Dragon Gliders	Motiongate Dubai	Inverted roller coaster	Mack Rides	April 25	
Dragon's Apprentice	Legoland Japan	Junior roller coaster	Zamperla	April 1	
Drean Hunters Society	Legendia Śląskie Wesołe Miasteczko	Steel roller coaster	unknown	2017	
Family Coaster	Happy Valley Chongqing	Boomerang roller coaster	Vekoma	2017	
Fireball	Furuvik	Boomerang roller coaster	Vekoma	May 20	
Flame Dragon	Visionland	Steel roller coaster	unknown	July 6	
Flying Wing Coaster	Happy Valley Chongqing	Wing Coaster	Bolliger & Mabilliard	July 8	
Galaxy Express	Oriental Heritage	Suspended roller coaster	Vekoma	April 16	
GaleForce	Playland's Castaway Cove	Launched roller coaster	S&S Worldwide	May 26	
Gold Rush	Attractiepark Slagharen	Infinity Coaster	Gerstlauer	April 13	
Great Desert-Rally	Happy Valley Chengdu	Wooden roller coaster	Great Coasters International	August 8	
Heidi: The Ride	Plopsaland	Wooden roller coaster	Great Coasters International	April 2	
Hydrus	Casino Pier	Euro-Fighter roller coaster	Gerstlauer	May 6	
Hype	Särkänniemi Amusement Park	Launched roller coaster	Premier Rides	June 18	
InvadR	Busch Gardens Williamsburg	Wooden roller coaster	Great Coasters International	April 7	
The Joker	Six Flags Great America; Six Flags New England; Six Flags Over Texas	4th Dimension roller coaster	S&S Worldwide	May 27; May 20; May 27	
Jungle Trailblazer	Oriental Heritage, Xiamen	Wooden roller coaster	Martin & Vleminckx	April 16	
Lech Coaster	Legendia	Steel roller coaster	Vekoma	July 1	
Light Speed	Visionland	Steel roller coaster	Intamin	July 6	
Little Dragon's Flight	Dragon Park	Suspended Family Coaster	Vekoma	January 25	
Madagascar Mad Pursuit	Motiongate Dubai	Infinity Coaster	Gerstlauer	2017	
Mine Blower	Fun Spot America, Kissimmee	Wooden roller coaster	The Gravity Group	June 23	
Mine Train Coaster	Dragon Park	Junior roller coaster	Vekoma	January 25	
Mine Train Coaster	Fun Park Biograd	Family roller coaster	SBF Visa Group	July 15	
Mine Train Coaster	Happy Valley Chongqing	Family roller coaster	Golden Horse	2017	
Mystic Timbers	Kings Island	Wooden roller coaster	Great Coasters International	April 15	
Pégase Express	Parc Astérix	Family Launch Coaster	Gerstlauer	June 11	
Queen Cobra	Sun World Danang Wonders	Inverted roller coaster	Vekoma	January 27	
Red Force	Ferrari Land	Launched roller coaster	Intamin	April 7	
Rollin' Thunder	Park at OWA	Steel roller coaster	Zamperla	July 21	
Scary Toys Factory	Legendia	Steel roller coaster	unknown	2017	
Serpent	Parc du Petit Prince	Family roller coaster	Zierer	April 8	
Sky Dragster	Skyline Park	Powered motorbike coaster	Maurer Rides	June 6	
Sky Rocket	Chimelong Paradise	Sky Rocket II	Premier Rides	September 26	
Smurf Village Express	Motiongate Dubai	Junior roller coaster	Gerstlauer	January 9	
Southern Express	Park at OWA	Junior roller coaster	Zamperla	July 21	
Star Trek: Operation Enterprise	Movie Park Germany	Launched roller coaster	Mack Rides	June 14	
Stunning Roller Coaster	Shengming Universal City	Spinning roller coaster	Golden Horse	September 27	
Super Cyclone	Santa's Village AZoosment Park	Steel roller coaster	Interpark	May 13	
Suspended Coaster	Window of the World	Suspended roller coaster	Beijing Jiuhua Amusement Rides Manufacturing Co.	December 24	
Turbo Track	Ferrari World	Shuttle roller coaster	Intamin	March 29	
Velikoluksky Miasokombinat-2	Wonder Island	Steel roller coaster	Intamin	2017	
Wave Breaker: The Rescue Coaster	Sea World San Antonio	Family Launch Coaster	Intamin	June 16	
Whistle Punk Chaser	Dollywood	Family roller Coaster	Zamperla	May 21	
Wild Waves	Playland's Castaway Cove	Steel roller coaster	E&F Miler Industries	September 7	
Zugo's Crystal Quest	Movie Animation Park Studios	Spinning roller coaster	SBF Visa Group	June 26	
The Branson Coaster	The Branson Coaster	Mountain coaster	Wiegand	July 18	

==== Relocated ====
Name	Park	Type	Manufacturer	Opened	Formerly	Ref(s)
Big Blue	Fun Park Biograd	Steel roller coaster	Schwarzkopf	July 15	Twist and Shout at Loudoun Castle	
Dragon's Run	Dragon Park	Steel roller coaster	Bolliger & Mabillard	January 25	Time Machine at Freestyle Music Park	
Creepy Crawler	Oakwood Theme Park	Steel roller coaster	Pinfari	August 1	Space Coaster at M&Ds Scotland's Theme Park	
Käpt'n Jack's Wilde Maus	Eifelpark	Wild Mouse roller coaster	Maurer Rides	April 8	Holly's Wilde Autofahrt at Holiday Park	
Looping	Southport Pleasureland	Steel roller coaster	Pinfari	August 10	Grizzly at Kongeparken	

==== Refurbished ====
Name	Park	Type	Manufacturer	Opened	Formerly	Ref(s)
Do-Dodonpa	Fuji-Q Highland	Air compressed launch	S&S Worldwide	2017	Dodonpa	
The Flying Cobras	Carowinds	Boomerang roller coaster	Vekoma	2017	Carolina Cobra	
Patriot	California's Great America	Floorless roller coaster	Bolliger & Mabillard	April 1	Vortex	
Shaman	Gardaland	VR Steel roller coaster	Vekoma	April 8	Magic Mountain	
Star Wars Hyperspace Mountain	Disneyland Paris	Launched roller coaster	Vekoma	May 7	Space Mountain: Mission 2	

=== Other attractions ===
==== New ====
Name	Park	Type	Opened	Ref(s)
Electro-Spin	Carowinds	Mondial Top Scan	March 2017	
Do-Si-Do	Carowinds	HUSS Troika	March 2017	
Zephyr	Carowinds	Zierer Wave Swinger	March 2017	
Rock 'N' Roller	Carowinds	Mack Music Express	March 2017	
Soaring Timbers	Canada's Wonderland	Mondial Inferno	May 2017	
Muskoka Plunge	Splash Works (Canada's Wonderland)	Trap-door body slides	June 2017	
Battle of Lake Erie	Waldameer & Water World	ProSlide Technology children's water slides and playground (RideHOUSE 500)	July 28	
Kung Fu Panda: Unstoppable Awesomeness	Motiongate Dubai	3D motion simulator	March 11	
Panem Aerial Tour	Motiongate Dubai	3D motion simulator	2017	
Shrek's Fairy Tale Journey	Motiongate Dubai	Dark ride	2017	
Cloudy with a Chance of Meatballs: River Expedition	Motiongate Dubai	River rapids ride	February 17	
Iron Man Experience	Hong Kong Disneyland	3D Motion simulator	January 11	
Justice League: Battle for Metropolis	Six Flags Great Adventure; Six Flags Magic Mountain; Six Flags Over Georgia	3D Interactive Dark Ride	June 17; June 12; May 26	
Race Through New York Starring Jimmy Fallon	Universal Studios Florida	3D simulator ride	April 6	
Pandora - The World of Avatar	Disney's Animal Kingdom	Themed area	May 27	
Avatar Flight of Passage	Disney's Animal Kingdom	3D augmented reality flight simulator	May 27	
Na'vi River Journey	Disney's Animal Kingdom	Dark boat ride	May 27	
Eye of the Storm	Kentucky Kingdom	Larson Super Loop	spring-summer	
Hershey Triple Tower	Hersheypark	Droptower	April 8	
Ferrari Land	Ferrari Land at PortAventura World	Ferrari themed amusement park	April 7	
Loki	Liseberg	Gyro Swing	April 29	
Symbolica	Efteling	Trackless dark ride	July 1	
Voletarium	Europapark	Flying theater	June 3	
Ghostbusters 5D	Heide Park	3D Interactive Dark Ride	2017	
LEGO Ninjago World	Legoland Florida and Legoland California	Themed area	January 12	
Star Tours - The Adventures Continue	Disneyland Paris	Motion simulator	March 18	
Rivers of Light	Disney's Animal Kingdom	Nighttime show	February 17	
Wet'n'Wild Buggy	Wet'n'Wild Gold Coast	Tomcar buggies/dune buggy cars	January 4	
Wonder Women: Lasso of Truth	Six Flags America	Funtime Starflyer	March 15	

==== Refurbished ====
Name	Park	Type	Opened	Formerly	Ref(s)
Guardians of the Galaxy – Mission: Breakout!	Disney California Adventure	Drop tower	May 27	The Twilight Zone Tower of Terror	
Despicable Me Minion Mayhem	Universal Studios Japan	Motion simulator	April 21	Back to the Future: The Ride	
The Gruffalo River Ride Adventure	Chessington World of Adventures	Dark ride	March 18	Bubbleworks	
Nemo & Friends SeaRider	Tokyo Disneysea	Motion Simulator	May 12	StormRider	
Vintage Car Adventure	Dreamworld	Vintage car	September 16	Avis Vintage Cars	
Tokyo Disneyland Electrical Parade DreamLights	Tokyo Disneyland	Electrical Parade	July	None (The Frozen unit replace Snow White unit and the Beauty and the Beast unit replaced the Finding Nemo unit)	

== Closed attractions & roller coasters ==
Name	Park	Type	Closed	Refs
Avalanche	Timber Falls Adventure Park	Wooden roller coaster	2017	
Big Ohhhh!	Fun Plex	Steel roller coaster	2017	
Boomerang	Knott's Berry Farm	Boomerang roller coaster	April 23	
Buzz Lightyear Astro Blasters	Hong Kong Disneyland	Shooting dark ride	August 31	
CinéMagique	Walt Disney Studios Park	Cinema	March 29	
Curse of DarKastle	Busch Gardens Williamsburg	Dark ride	September 4	
Dinosaurs Alive!	Kings Island	Walk-through exhibit	October 29	
Dragon Challenge	Islands of Adventure	Dual Inverted roller coasters	September 4	
Finnish Fling	Worlds of Fun	Rotor	October 29	
Galaxi	Palace Playland	Steel roller coaster	September 4	
Georgia Cyclone	Six Flags Over Georgia	Wooden roller coaster	July 30	
Grand Circuit Raceway	Tokyo Disneyland	Futuristic Car Ride	January 11	
Grand Canyon	Bugok Hawaii	Steel roller coaster	May 28	
The Great Movie Ride	Disney's Hollywood Studios	Dark ride	August 13	
Green Lantern: First Flight	Six Flags Magic Mountain	4th Dimension roller coaster	July 2017	
H.M.B. Endeavor	California's Great America	Looping Starship	October 29	
King Chaos	Six Flags Great America	Top Spin	August 27	
Launch Pad	Canada's Wonderland	Trampoline Pad (Up-charge attraction)	October 30	
Log Jammer	Kennywood	Log flume	September 17	
Logger's Run	California’s Great America	Log flume	October 29	
Looping Thunder	Oaks Amusement Park	Steel roller coaster	September 24	
Max Speed	Suzhou Amusement Land	Shuttle Loop roller coaster	October 31	
Power Surge	Six Flags Fiesta Texas	Shoot the Chute	July 23	
River Battle	Dollywood	Interactive boat ride	September 4	
Shrek 4-D	Universal Studios Hollywood	4-D attraction	August 13	
Slammer	Thorpe Park Resort	Sky Swatter	May 2	
Sand Dune Lagoon	Carolina Harbor	Relaxation Area	2017	
Silver Mine	Freizeitpark Plohn	Steel roller coaster	October 31	
Stinger	Dorney Park & Wildwater Kingdom	Inverted boomerang roller coaster	October 29	
Star Jets	Tokyo Disneyland	Spinning Spaceship	October 10	
Submarine Quest	SeaWorld San Diego	Kids Submarine ride	2017	
Suspended Looping Coaster	Suzhou Amusement Land	Suspended Looping Coaster	October 31	
T2-3D: Battle Across Time	Universal Studios Florida	3-D and live-action show	October 8	
The Twilight Zone Tower of Terror	Disney California Adventure	Dark ride	January 2	
Thunder Coaster	Nasu Highland Park	Steel roller coaster	November 26	
Universe of Energy	Epcot	Traveling theater dark ride	August 13	
Wild Mouse	Blackpool Pleasure Beach	Wooden Wild Mouse	August 6	
Xtreme	Blue Bayou Dixie Landing	Spinning roller coaster	2017	
