= A Nightmare on Q Street =

A Nightmare On Q Street was a haunted attraction located at Fun-Plex amusement park in Omaha, Nebraska. The attraction was aimed at teenagers 13 & up as well as young adults. A Nightmare On Q Street was open on select weeknights and every weekend in October along with one weekend in September and November.

== About ==
In 2003, The Haunted Valley was created as a free Halloween display by The Miller Family in their backyard for all the neighborhood to experience. It was a themed walk-through display of Halloween props, sets and featured about 4 to 5 kids acting as zombies, monsters, ghosts, etc. Every year more changes would be made to add on to the previous year.

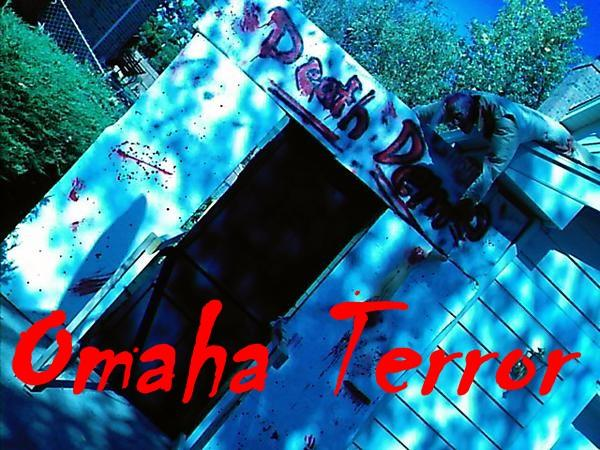

In 2006, the name was changed to Death Demo and featured more detailed ideas and was intended for teens only. Guests would start out on one side of the families house and make their way through the haunted maze that ended on the other side of the house. For the 2007 season, the name was changed to Shadows of the Unknown to show that the haunt was becoming a more serious project and wasn't just a family-oriented Halloween display.

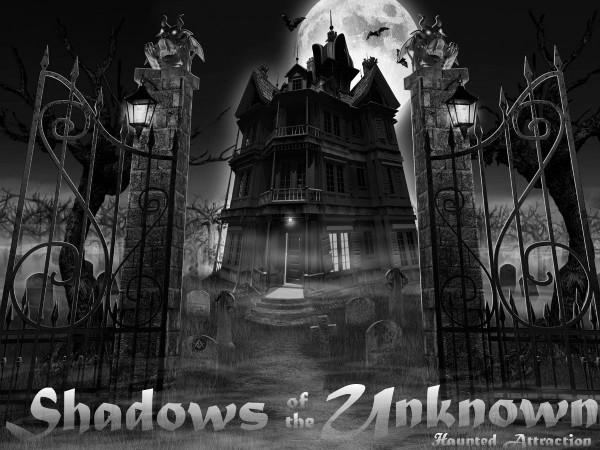

Shadows of the Unknown started using social networking sites such as Myspace, YouTube, and Facebook to spread word throughout Omaha. After friends and family started spreading the word about the free haunted house, The Miller Family needed a new location that could house all the guests pouring into the neighborhood to experience the haunt. After months of searching for building and lots to rent, a letter was written to Fun-Plex asking if they would want to team up with Shadows of the Unknown and have a haunted scream park during the Halloween season. Fun-Plex wrote back and soon after, work began on the new project. Shadows of the Unknown was officially changed to A Nightmare On Q Street (Fun-Plex is located at 7003 Q. Street). The haunted attraction was built on the lot that formerly housed the bumper cars and now has a basic facade resembling an abandoned building. Today, A Nightmare On Q Street has gained attention throughout the city of Omaha including hosting blood drives from The Red Cross, radio ticket give-aways, and is featured on Omaha news stations. Promotions for A Nightmare On Q Street have been aired throughout October on select radio stations along with posters and coupons at various stores and businesses throughout the city. As of 2011, A Nightmare On Q Street has partnered with many sponsors including Ronald McDonald House Charities and Monster Energy.

== The Attraction ==
The haunt was inside the old bumper cars building and had a gothic mansion facade. Guests would enter a small library room where they experienced a "preshow" about the character Mr. Raven and how demons have taken over the house. After the show is over guests were let into the rest of the house and experience a variety of original sets designed to scare them in every element. The layout of the attraction was completely changed for each season and took roughly 8 months to construct. Each room consisted of 1 to 3 actors and for the outside portion of the house there were typically 4 to 5 actors. The outside area of the attraction would be completely changed and re-themed for each year as well. The entire attraction took roughly 15 to 20 minutes for a group to complete.

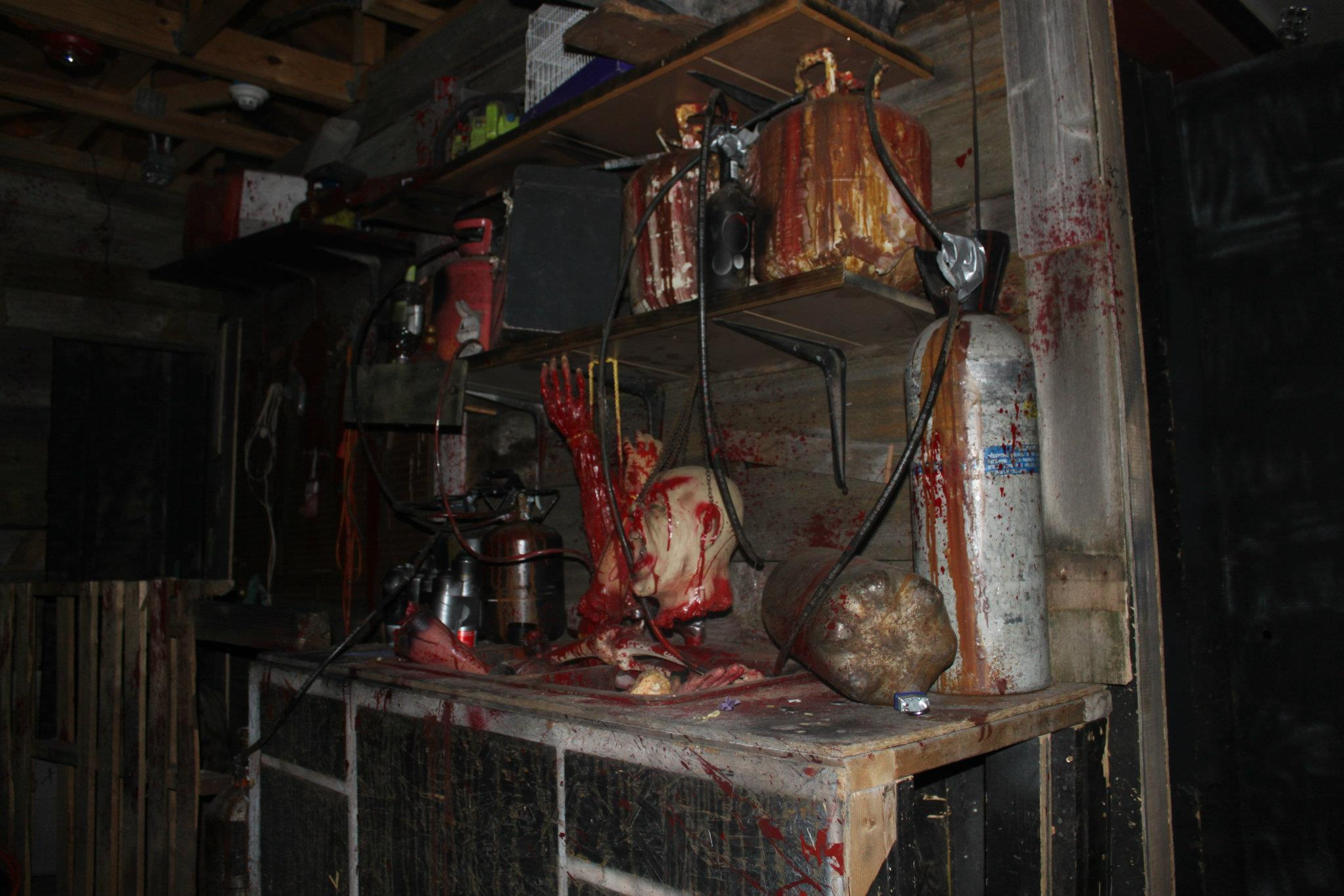

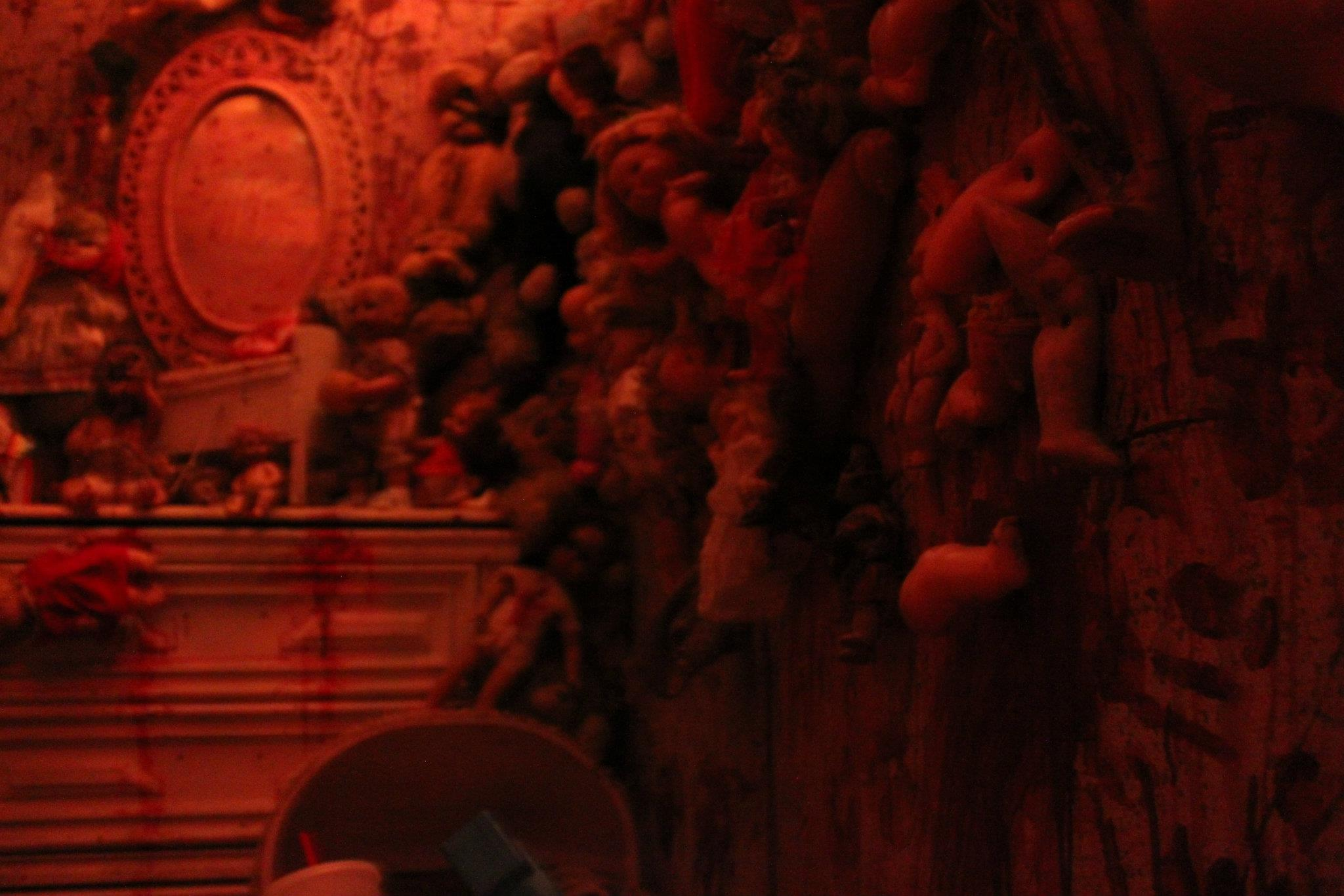

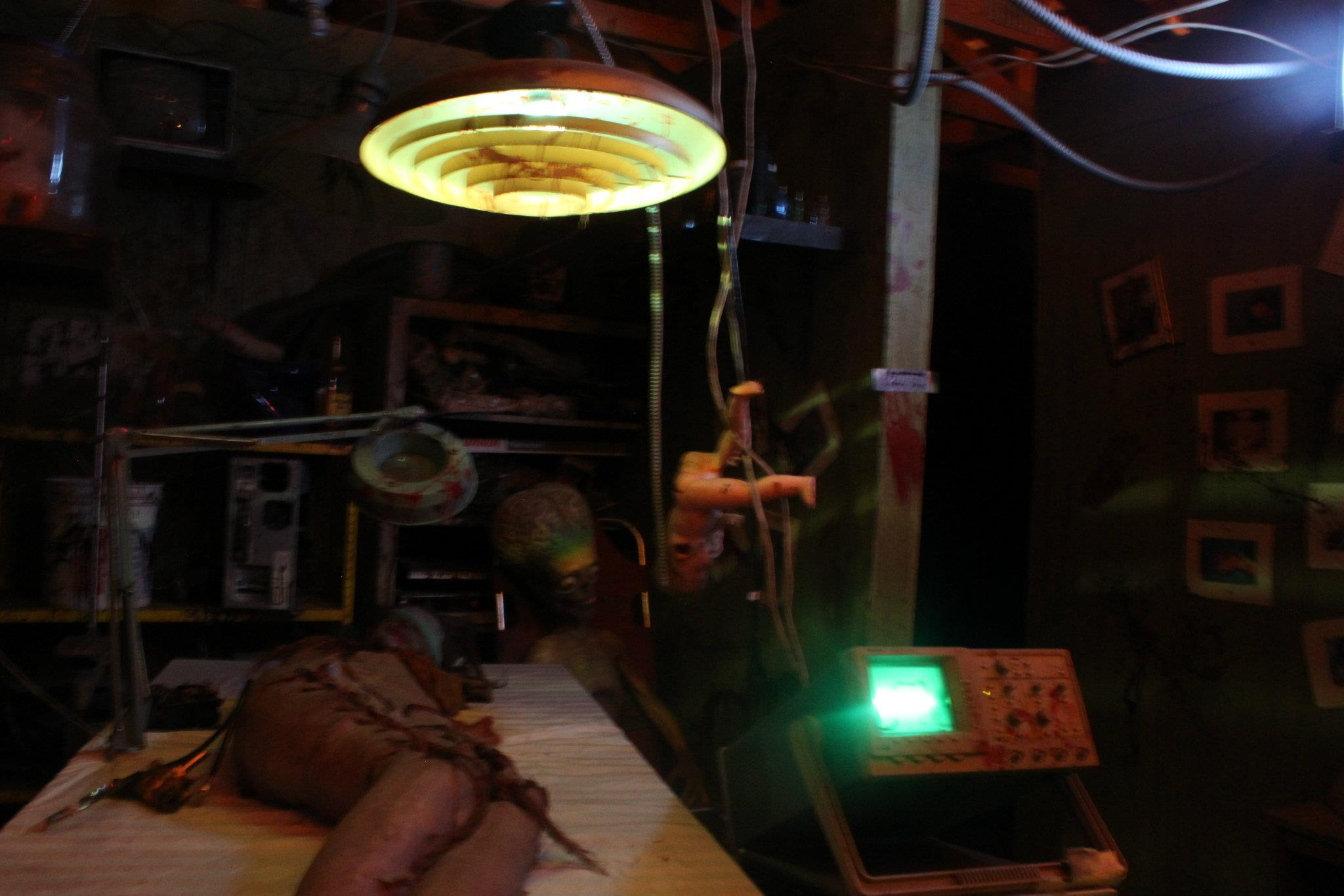
