= Roller coaster wheel assembly =

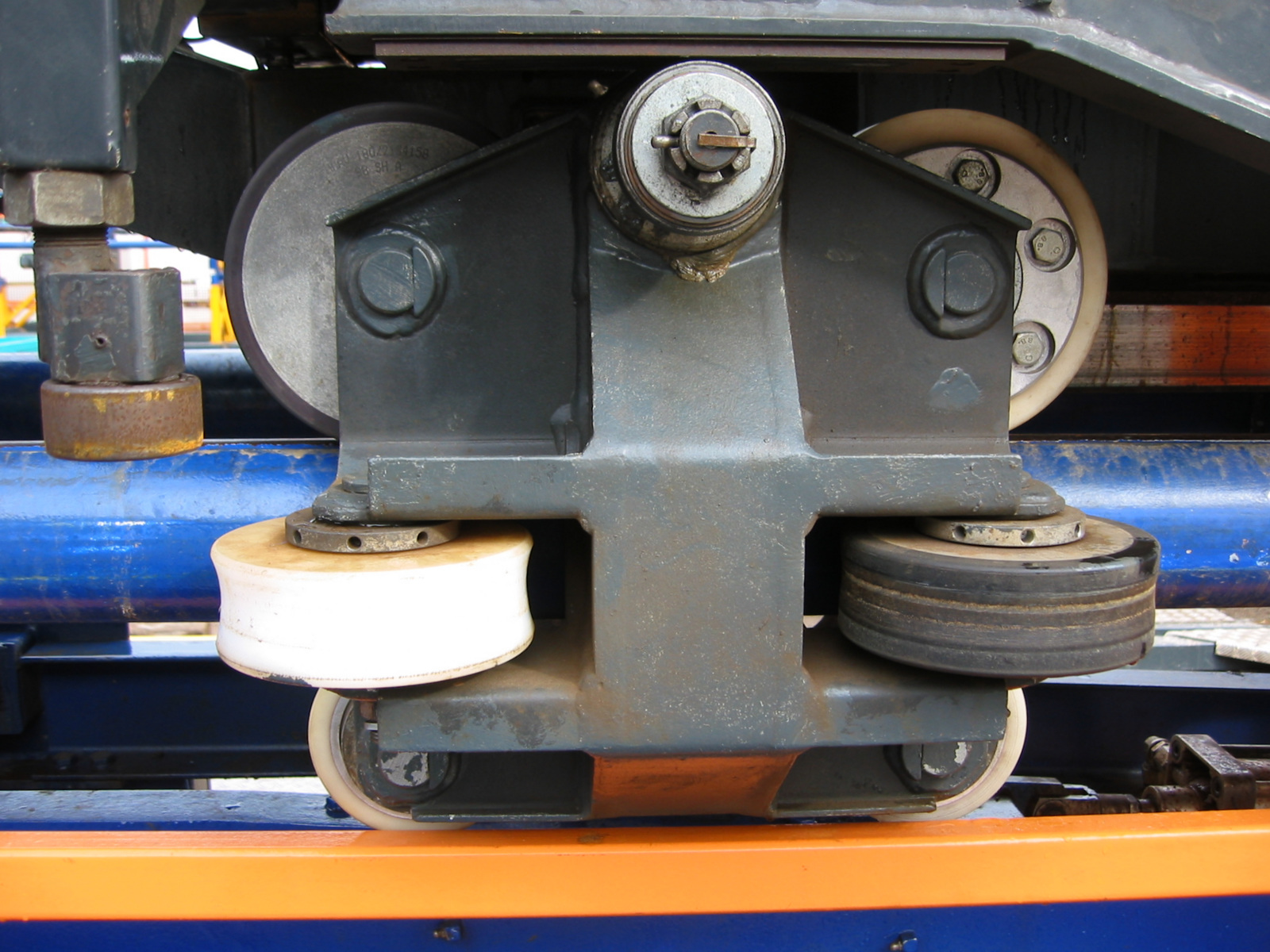
Wheel assembly of the Spinning Racer coaster at Fantasy Island

On a roller coaster, the wheel assemblies are the point of contact between the cars carrying the riders and the track rails. They often consist of at least three wheels per assembly, but can contain more.

The typical arrangement of the wheels are:

- Road wheels (also known as running or tractor wheels): Positioned on the top of the rail, bearing the weight of the train.
- Side-friction wheels (also known as guide wheels): Positioned on a horizontal plane, either inside or outside of the rails. These hug the sides of the rail, keeping the train centered.
- Upstop wheels (also known as underfriction, underlocking, or uplift wheels): Positioned under the rails to keep the train from lifting off the track.

== Design ==
On modern roller coasters, both wooden and steel, the same basic design of wheel assembly is found. Each wheel assembly typically consists of at least three wheels per assembly, arranged in three positions: top, side, and under the rails, known as "road wheels", "side-friction wheels", and "upstop wheels", respectively. Most modern roller coasters typically have pairs of wheels in each orientation, with six wheels per assembly, but this can vary by ride.

The upstop system was developed and patented in 1919 by John A. Miller. He patented a design to make roller coaster attractions safer and more thrilling. His design featured wheels underneath the rails alongside the typical road wheels, keeping the train on the track more securely, allowing for longer and steeper drops.

Most roller coasters have some form of up-stop system that runs underneath the rails. They are usually wheels, but some older roller coasters and low-intensity children's rides may utilize a steel plate or bar positioned under the rails instead. Upstop wheels keep the train from lifting off of the track while traversing hills that may provide negative g-forces, or through inversions. They are typically the smallest wheels out of the assembly.

Side-friction wheels hug the sides of the rail, on the outside or the inside, depending on the ride manufacturer. Early Arrow Dynamics steel coasters oriented the side-friction wheels on the inside of the rails. Side friction wheels keep the train centered in the track, avoiding derailment.

The final set of wheels in the assembly are known as road wheels. Road wheels are typically the largest set of wheels in the assembly, and roll on top of the rails. These wheels bear the weight of the train. They are typically made from a polyurethane or nylon and polyurethane blend, while side friction and up-stop wheels can be made of the same materials, or conversely of steel. Some older wooden roller coasters utilize steel wheels for every wheel in the assembly. The benefits of the polyurethane or nylon/polyurethane blend wheels are low rolling resistance, high load endurance, a smoother ride, and high durability.

== Variations & examples ==
Wheel assemblies vary from manufacturer to manufacturer, and from ride to ride. Some models, such as Arrow Dynamics looping coasters, orient their side-friction wheels on the inside of the rails, rather than the outside. Wooden roller coasters also utilize the interior of the rail for side-friction orientation.

On inverted roller coasters, such as those produced by Swiss manufacturer Bolliger & Mabillard (B&M), the wheel assemblies are typically in the same configurations, despite the cars being positioned below the track. These wheel assemblies feature some form of cover to protect riders from any debris or fluids kicked up by the wheels above.

Some roller coasters utilize unique wheel configurations:

- The Intamin-manufactured Superman: Escape from Krypton, which operated at Six Flags Magic Mountain from 1997 to 2024, does not use typical side-friction wheels, instead using a thin steel rail mounted in the center of the track to keep the train centered, while road and upstop wheels roll along the outer rails. The cars on the now-defunct Tower of Terror II at Dreamworld used a similar design.
- On X2, a fourth-dimension coaster also located at Six Flags Magic Mountain, the trains utilize four rails, rather than the usual two, in order to allow for the individual rotation of rider seats. With this configuration, the cars have six wheels per assembly on the main rails, and an additional four wheels per side on the extra set of rails.
- On flying roller coasters, such as those produced by Bolliger & Mabillard and Vekoma, the road wheels and upstop wheels are typically the same size due to the train's upright orientation switching throughout the ride.
- Devil's Loop at Legendia does not use typical upstop or side-friction wheels, instead using a hybrid design that does both jobs.

== Gallery ==
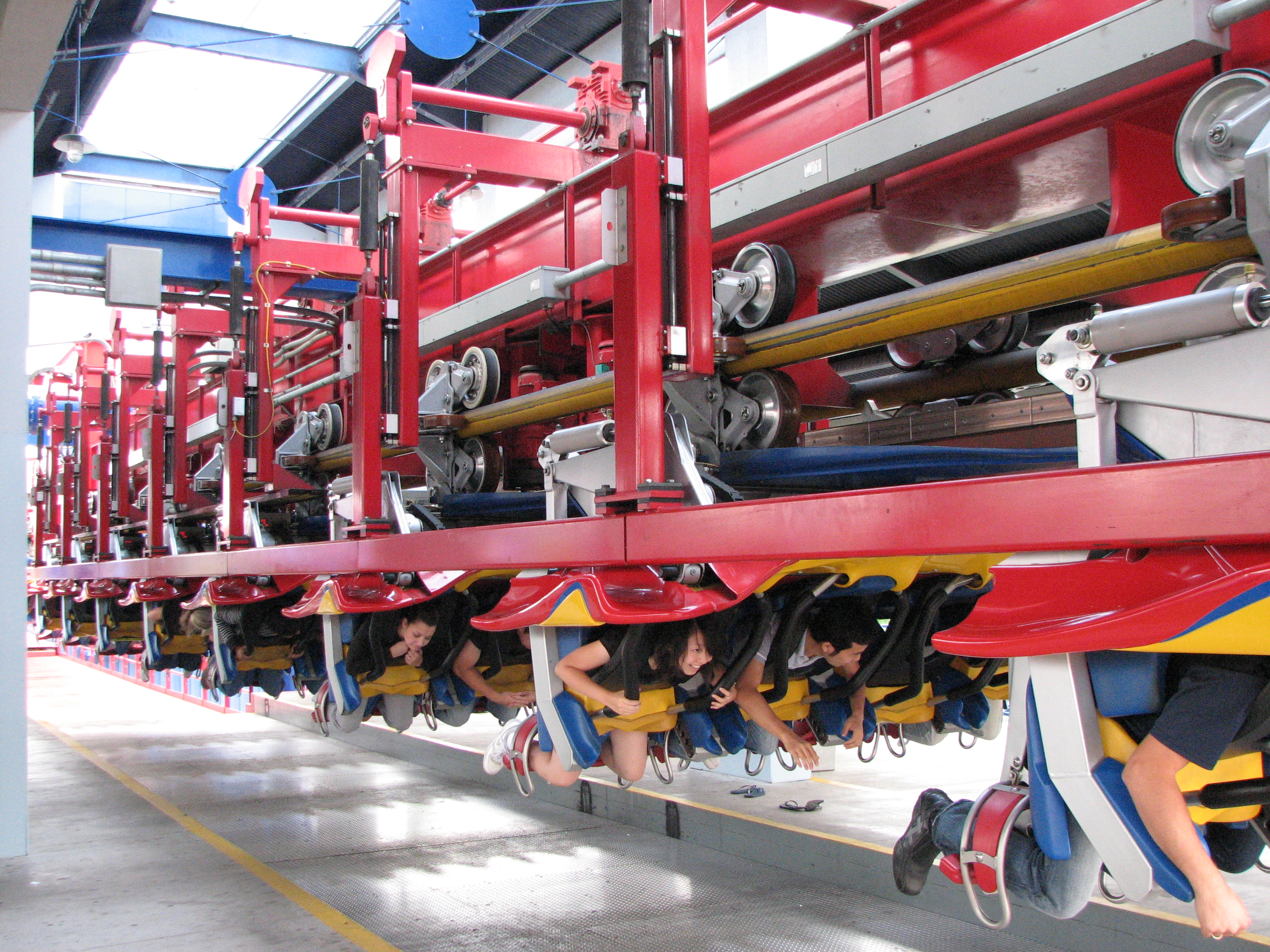
Wheel assemblies on the B&M flying coaster, Superman: Ultimate Flight. Note the same-sized road and upstop wheels, a common configuration on flying coasters.
