= Devil's Loop =

Steel roller coaster in Chorzów, Poland

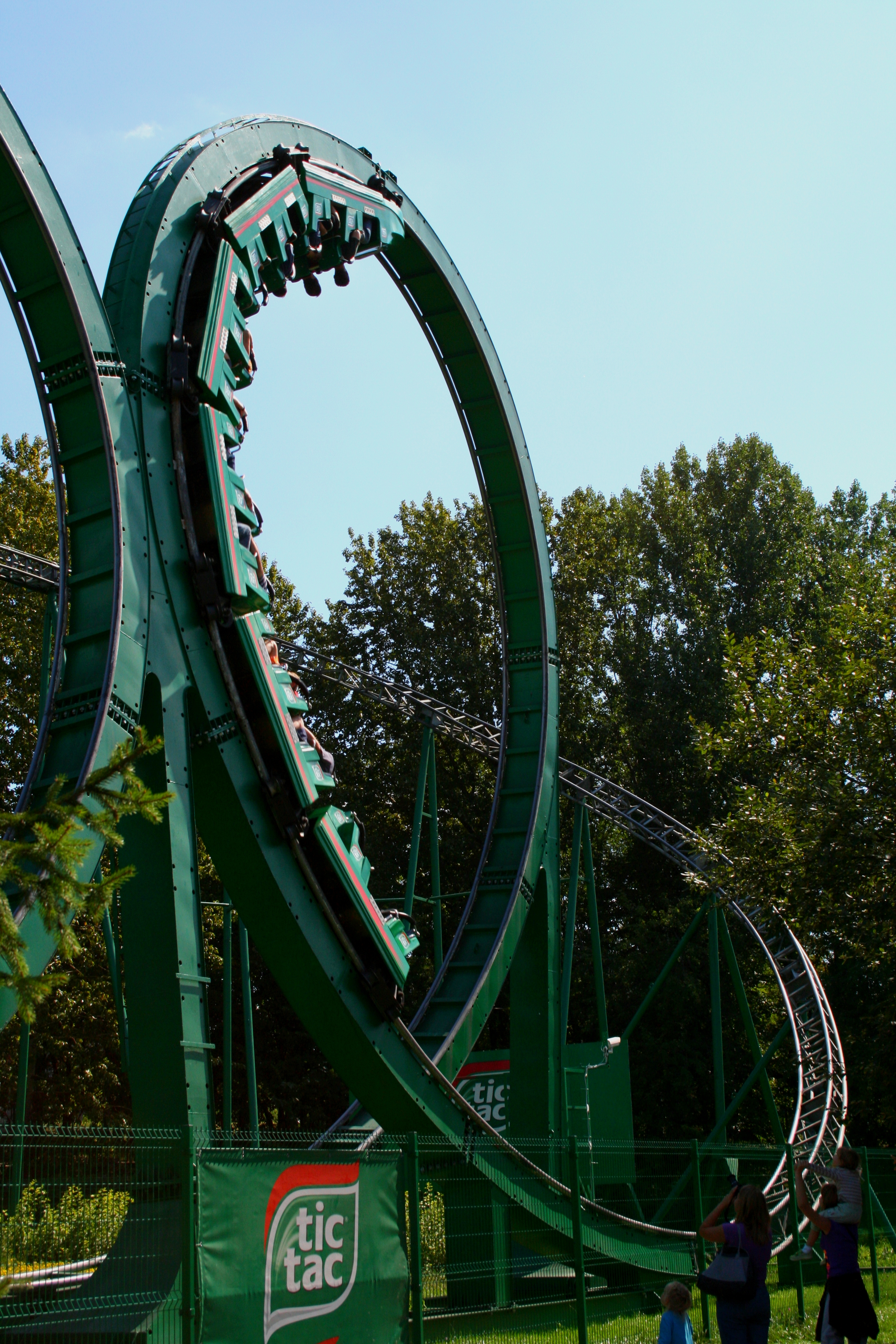

Legendia
- Location: Legendia
- Coordinates: 50°16′33.5″N 18°59′42.1″E
- Status: Operating
- Opening date: June 24, 2007
- Website: https://www.legendia.pl

General statistics
- Type: Steel
- Manufacturer: Soquet
- Model: Double Loop
- Height: 20 m (66 ft)
- Speed: 70 km/h (43 mph)
- Inversions: 2
- Duration: 1:27
- G-force: 3
- Height restriction: 140 cm (4 ft 7 in)
- Trains: Single train with 6 cars. Riders are arranged 2 across in 2 rows for a total of 24 riders per train.
- Website: https://www.legendia.pl/atrakcje/atrakcje-legendii
- Sponsored by: Tic Tacs (2007-2011)

Devil's Loop (pl. Diabelska pętla) is a roller coaster located in Legendia. It was moved in 2007 from American Park of Adventure in the United Kindgom.

It was the first ever roller coaster in Poland to feature inversions. The second-to-last row of seats faces backwards, akin to DC Rivals HyperCoaster. It also features an unusual wheel assembly without a distinguishable up-stop wheel or side wheel. Instead, it has a hybrid up-stop/side wheel that does both jobs. Between the 2018 and 2019 seasons, it underwent an extensive refurbishment that included a name change from Tornado to Devil's Loop.

== Ride summary ==
Immediately after leaving the station, the train climbs a 20 meter lift hill, then goes down a right-hand curve into a drop. After the drop, it traverses two consecutive loops and a low turn to the left. It then goes into a right hand helix into the station.

== Theme ==
From 2007 to 2011, when Tic Tac was the sponsor, the logo appeared on the front of the train, at the entrance, as well as on a wall on the station.

After the 2018–2019 refurbishment, the station received a mining theme with elements of folklore. The track is green with dark gray supports, however, the running rails are metallic gray. The train has a blue-brown color.

== Locations and name changes ==
The coaster has changed locations twice and names 10 times:

#	Park		Name	Years of operation
1	(United Kingdom)	Lightwater Valley	Soopa Loopa	1988–1994
2	(United Kingdom)	American Park of Adventure	Iron Wolf	1995
2	(United Kingdom)	American Park of Adventure	Gladiators	1996
2	(United Kingdom)	American Park of Adventure	Sky Looper	1997–1998
2	(United Kingdom)	American Park of Adventure	Twin Looper	1999–2002
2	(United Kingdom)	American Park of Adventure	JCB Twin Looper	2003–2004
2	(United Kingdom)	American Park of Adventure	Twin Looper	2005–2006
3	(Poland)	Legendia	Tic-Tac Tornado	2007–2011
3	(Poland)	Legendia	Tornado	2012–2018
3	(Poland)	Legendia	Diabelska pętla (Devil's Loop)	2019+

== Gallery ==
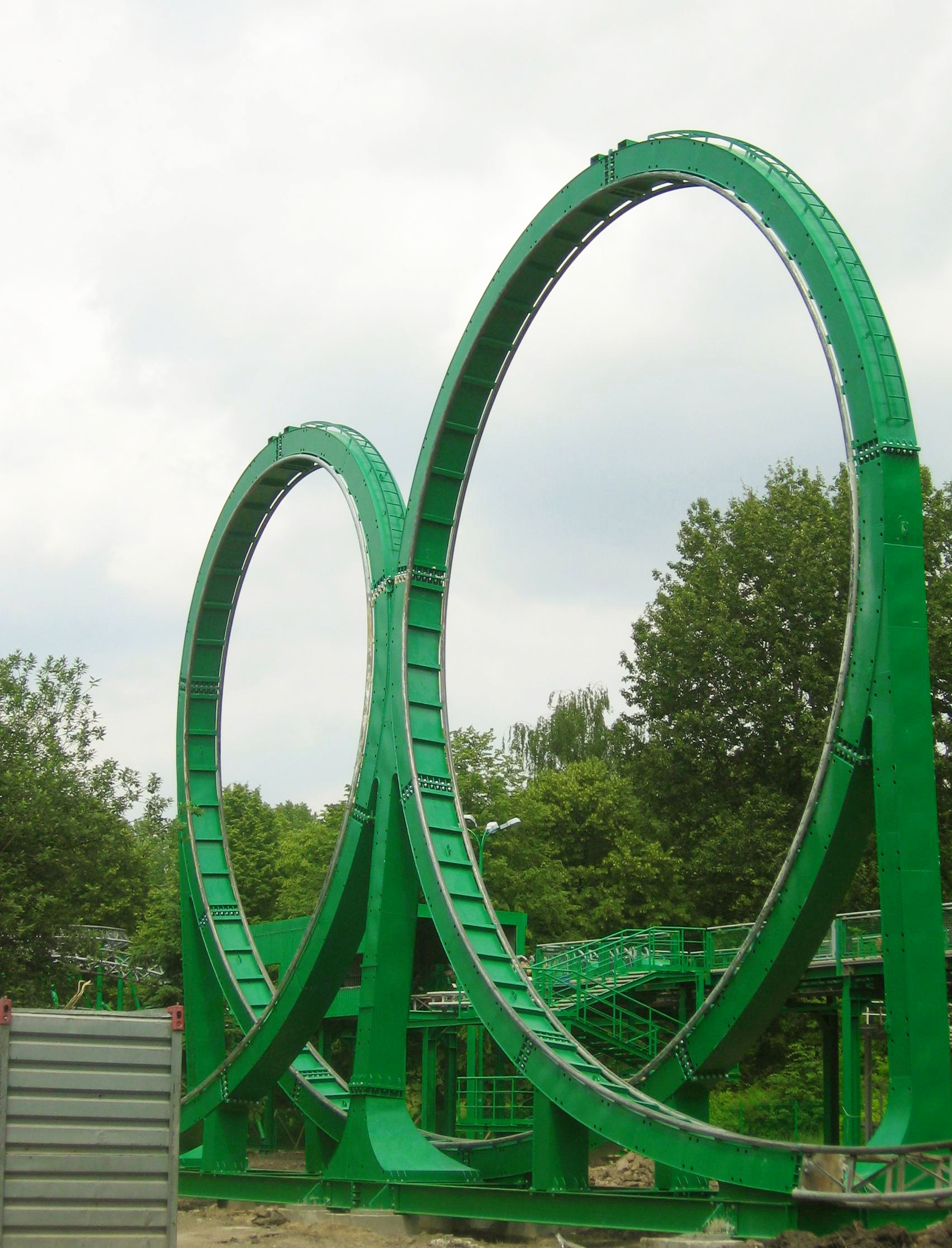
The double loop

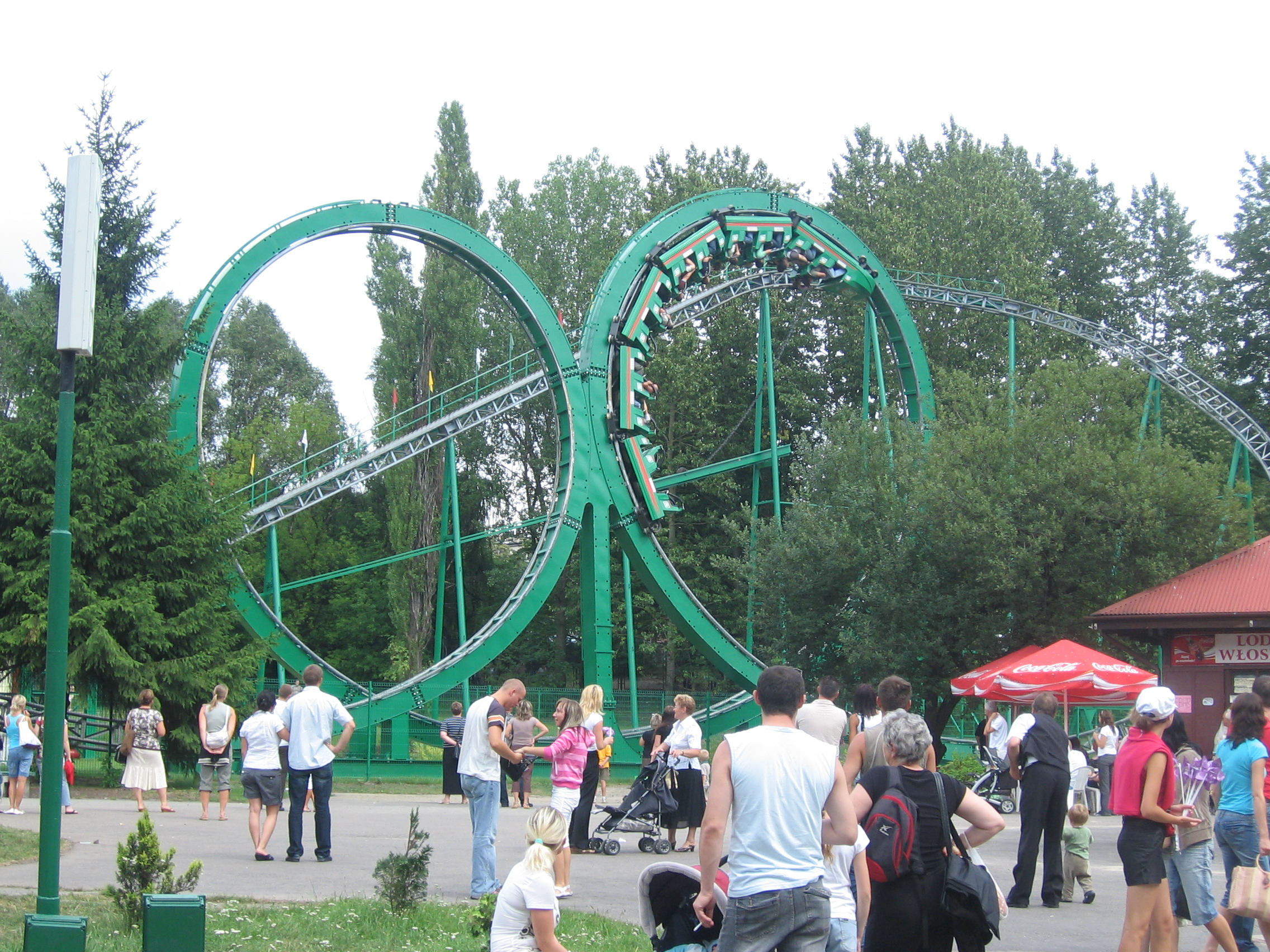
A train traversing the first loop

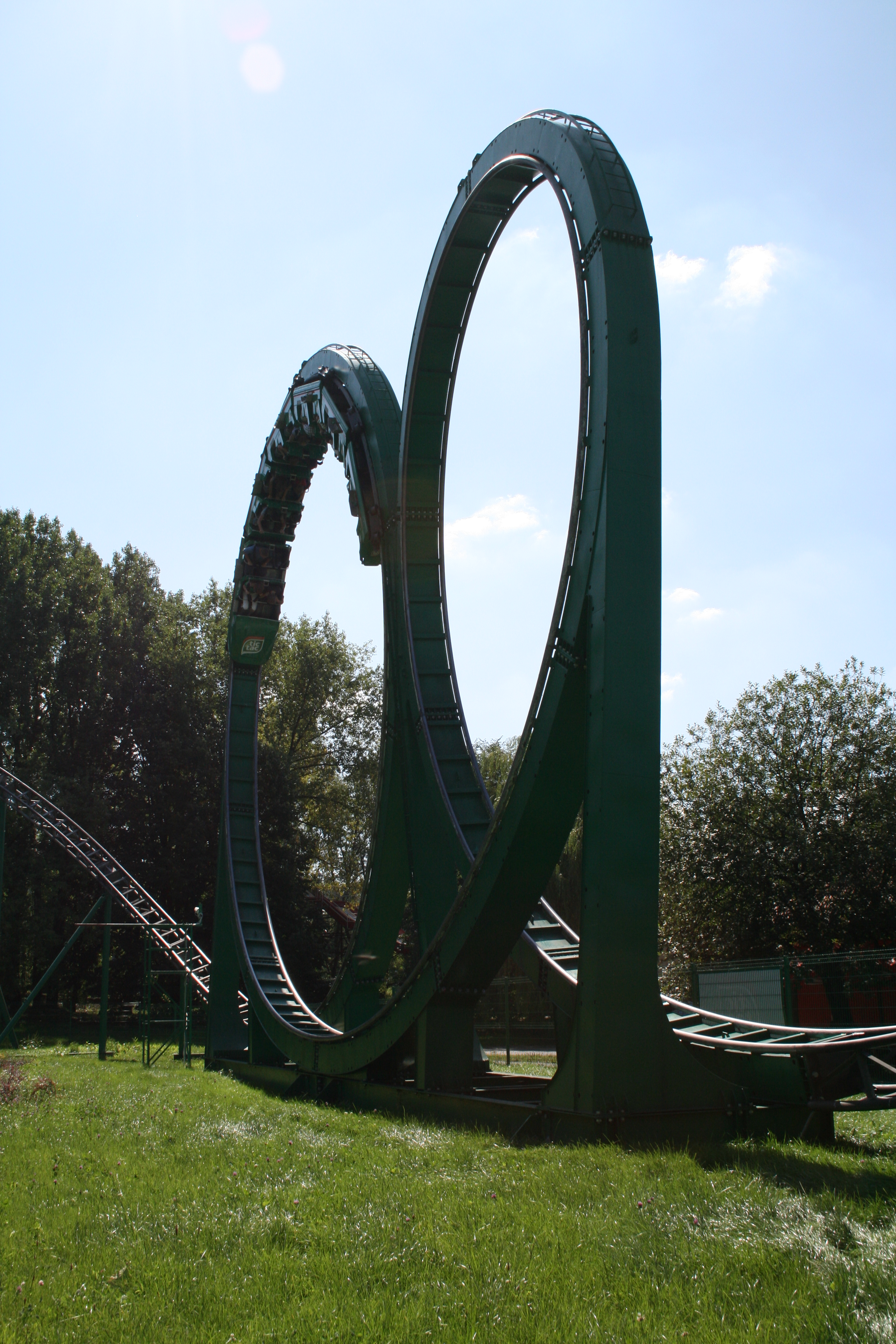
A view of the coaster from the path leading to the entrance
