= Legoland Japan Resort =

Amusement park in Minato-ku, Nagoya, Japan

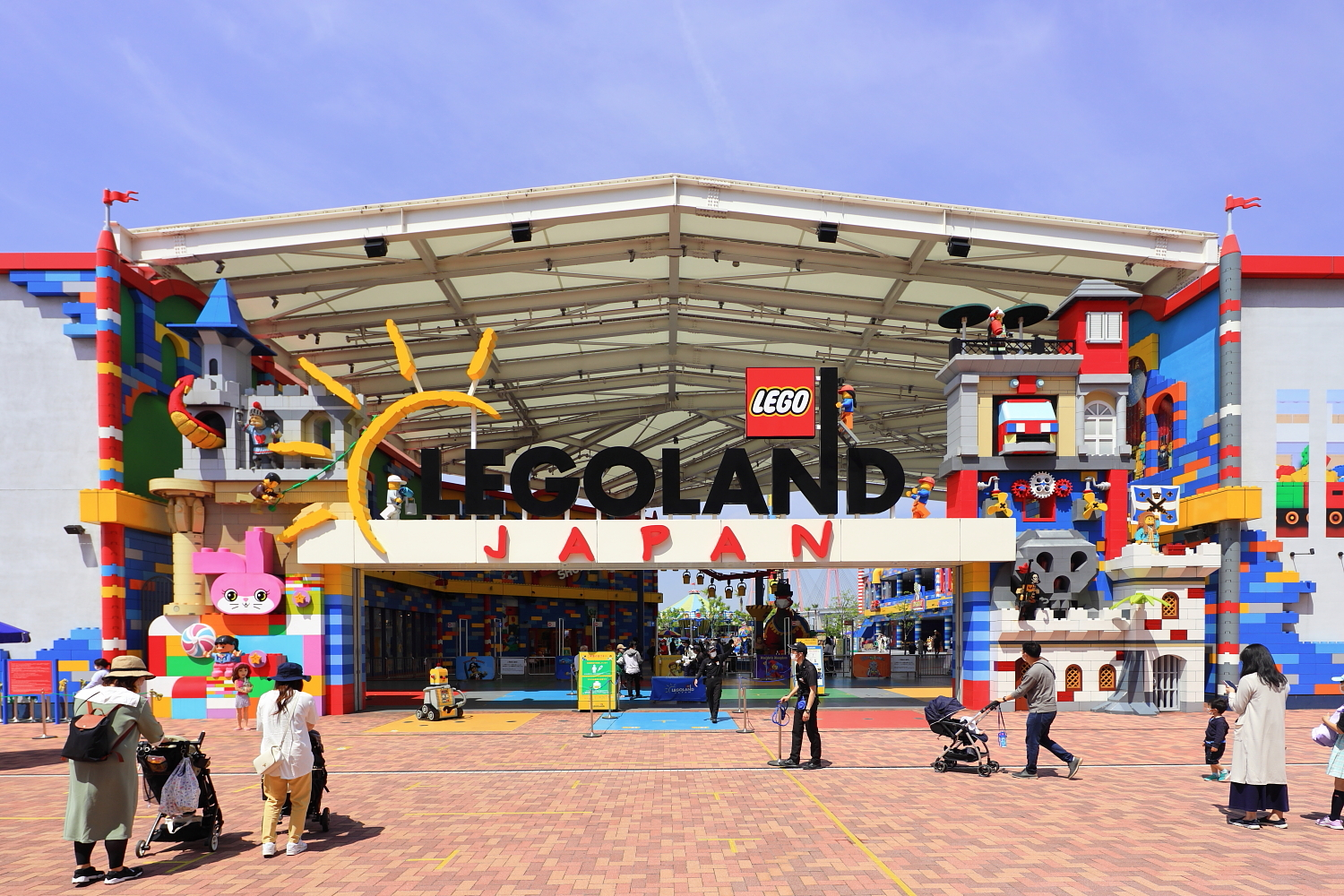
- Entrance
- Interactive map of Legoland Japan Resort
- Location: Minato-ku, Nagoya, Japan
- Coordinates: 35°03′02″N 136°50′36″E
- Status: Operating
- Opened: April 1, 2017; 9 years ago
- Owner: Merlin Entertainments
- Theme: Lego toys and childhood amusement
- Operating season: Year-round
- Area: 23 acres (93,000 m^{2})

Attractions
- Total: Over 40
- Website: Official website

Legoland Japan Resort (Japanese: レゴランド・ジャパン) is a theme park in Nagoya, Japan. Opening on April 1, 2017, it was the first Legoland theme park in Japan and the second in Asia (after the Legoland Malaysia Resort), and the eighth worldwide. Upon opening, the park was projected to attract over two million visitors every year.

== History ==
On June 30, 2014, Merlin Entertainments announced plans to open a Legoland Resort in Nagoya. Construction officially began on April 15, 2015. With a budget of US$250 million, construction was implemented by Art and Project, TAA Group and Tejix.

The nine-hectare (22.24 acre) park is located in Nagoya's Minato Ward and contains seven areas. It has over 40 attractions and uses approximately 17 million bricks. Attractions include Imagination Celebration, completed on March 12, 2017, and Lego-brick cityscapes of places like Tokyo and Nagoya, which were completed on March 17, 2017.

On March 27, 2017, a commemorative Lego-themed train began running on the Nagoya Rinkai Rapid Transit Aonami Line to celebrate the park's opening. The commuter train, named Legoland Train, began daily service on the Aonami Line, traveling from central Nagoya to the new theme park.

Merlin Entertainments announced plans to build a Legoland Hotel and a Sea Life aquarium next to the park in 2018 to help transform the area into a resort, which was expected to cost JPY¥10 billion.

On December 1, 2017, Legoland Hotel began accepting reservations for its grand opening on April 28, 2018. The opening of Sea Life Aquariums was set for April 15, 2018.

On February 28, 2020, the park was closed due to the COVID-19 pandemic. The park reopened on March 23, 2020, with limited services, reduced business hours, mask mandates and mandatory temperature checks. Lego Ninjago Live, the Observation Tower, Submarine Adventure, The Coral Reef buffet, and the Knight's Table restaurant were not in operation.

== Park locations ==
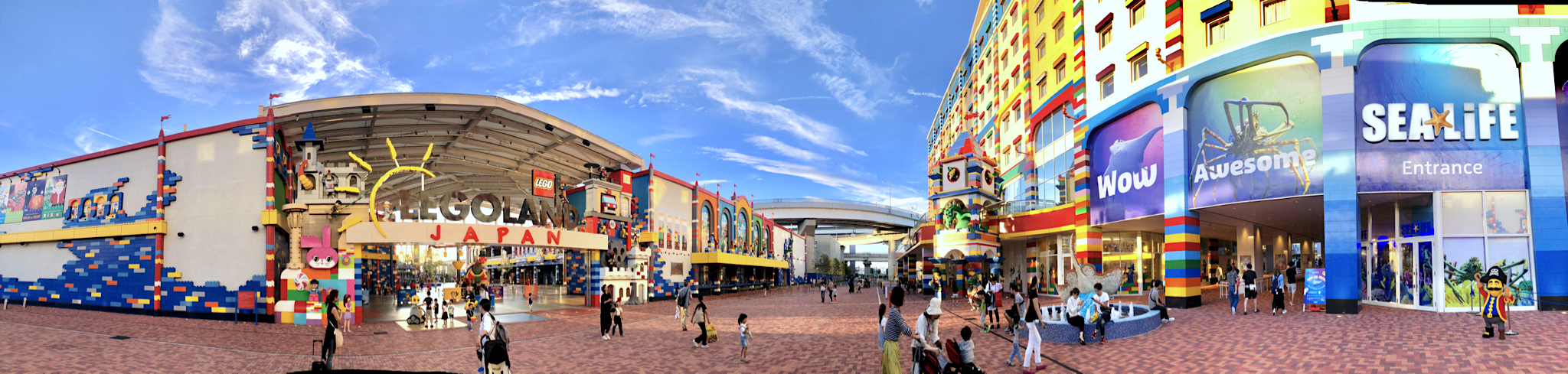
Entrance of Legoland Japan
Themed areas within LEGOLAND Japan Resort

Themed areas of discovery within the resort include:

- Bricktopia (ブリックトピア)
- Miniland (ミニランド)
- Adventure (アドベンチャー)
- LEGO City (レゴシティ)
- Knight's Kingdom (ナイトキングダム)
- Pirate Shores (パイレーツショア)
- Factory (ファクトリー)

=== Bricktopia ===
Bricktopia includes the robotic workshops Build and Test and Lego Creative, where park goers can learn to build and program their robots.

Lego Ninjago Live offers guests a 4D interactive experience. Other interactive Bricktopia attractions include DUPLO Play, DUPLO Express, Imagination Celebration and Observation Tower. The Chicken Diner offers chicken meals and sandwiches, while Pino Cart offers Pino ice cream in a Lego souvenir box.

=== Miniland ===
Located at the center of the park, Miniland features many popular tourist attractions from across Japan built from LEGO bricks, including locations in Tokyo, Osaka, Kyoto and Nagoya. 10,496,352 LEGO bricks were used to recreate the Japanese locations.

City/Region	Added	Closed	Image	Description
Tokyo	2017	–		Featuring models of Tokyo Skytree, Tokyo Tower, Shibuya Crossing, Sensō-ji, and the Shinkansen.
Sapporo	2017	–		Featuring models of Sapporo TV Tower and Sapporo Snow Festival.
Nagoya	2017	–		Featuring models of Nagoya Castle and Nagoya Dome.
(Kyoto Prefecture) Kyoto	2017	–		Featuring models of Kiyomizu-dera, Kinkaku-ji, Byōdō-in, and Gion.
Hyōgo Prefecture	2017	–		Featuring models of Osaka (Tsutenkaku Tower, Dōtonbori), Kobe (Kobe Port Tower), and Himeji (Himeji Castle).
Hiroshima Prefecture	2017	–		Featuring a model of Miyajima, Hiroshima.

=== Adventure ===
The Adventure area includes interactive games and maze-like areas for children's play. It is located on the east side of the park along with the park's underwater attractions. Rides in this area include Submarine Adventure, S.Q.U.I.D. Surfer, Cargo Ace and Beetle Bounce. The Coral Reef Pizza and Pasta Buffet, Artifact Shop, Sub Shop and Oasis Snacks are also located in this area of the park.

=== Lego City ===
Lego City is located on the park's north side and has activities such as Junior Driving School, Coast Guard HQ and Rescue Academy. In this area of the park, guests learn to drive an electric car, take the wheel during a boat ride and work together to put out fires. The Lego Cinema plays Lego films and shopping is available in Studio Store, Heartlake Shop and City Shop. Pit Stop Juice ‘n’ Drive, Brick House Burgers and Marina Snack Shack offer snacks and lunch.

=== Knight's Kingdom ===
The Knight's Kingdom is found on the park's northwest side. The medieval-themed area includes roller coasters like Dragon and Dragon's Apprentice, as well as attractions including Merlin's Flying Machines, Merlin's Challenge and Kingdom Games. Shops include King's Market and Knight's Table Restaurant.

=== Pirates Shores ===
Pirate Shores is surrounded by water with activities including Splash Bottle, Castaway Camp, Anchors Away! and Blue Coat Games. The Lost Booty Trading Post is a gift shop in this area offering souvenirs.

=== Factory ===
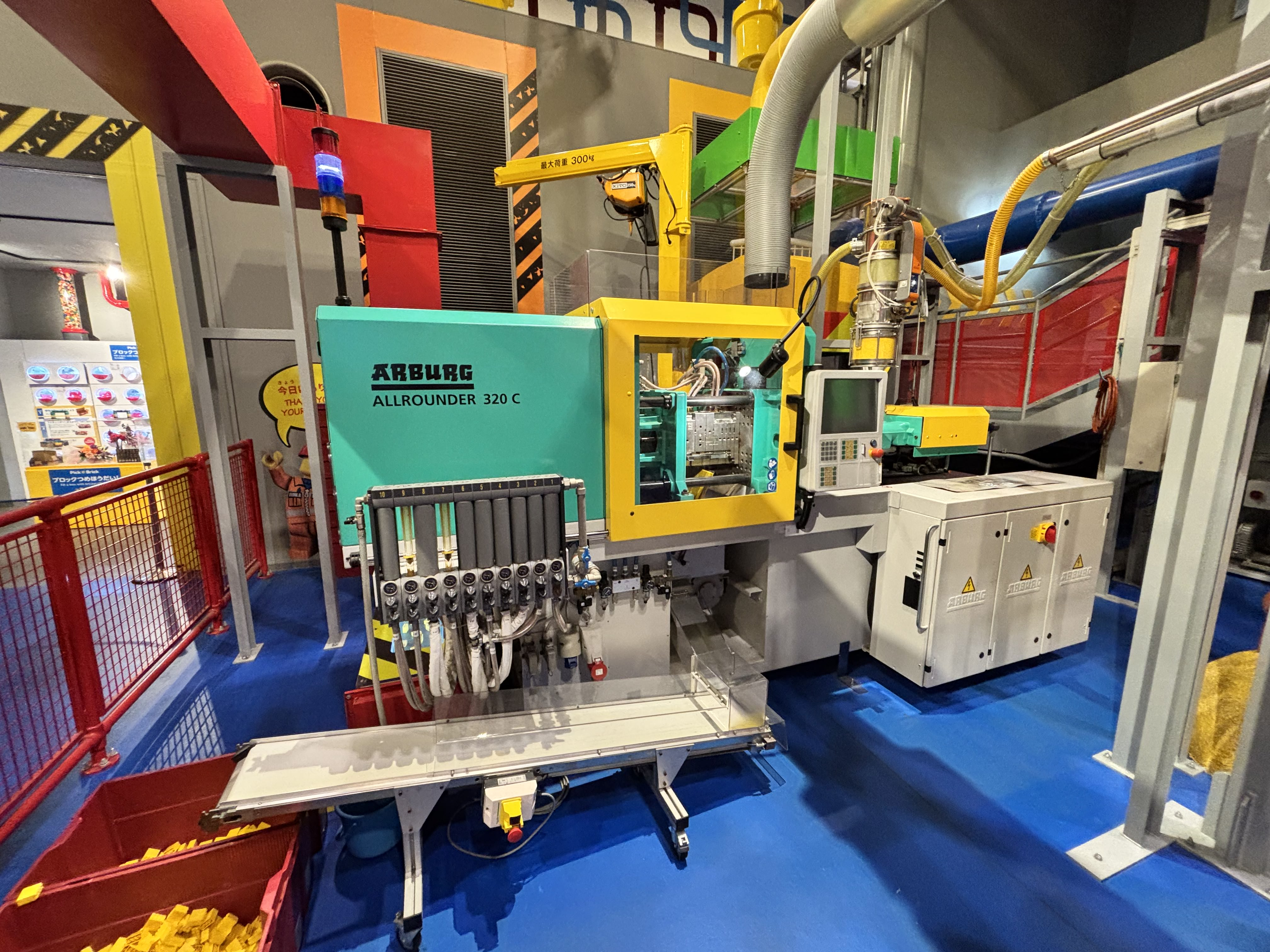
Inside the factory that produces the Lego pieces.

The Factory is located on the park's southwest side, containing The Lego Factory Tour. The Lego Story, displayed along the walls, shares Lego and Legoland history with park visitors as they walk through the factory's corridors. On display is the machinery that creates various Lego pieces used throughout the park. After the tour, visitors receive a new Lego piece from the production line as a souvenir. All photos taken in the park can be picked up at The Photo Shop, which offers a limited edition Legoland photo album. The Corner Shop provides stroller and wheelchair services and sells sundries and other useful goods. Souvenirs purchased in the park can be dropped off here and picked up upon leaving the park. Other shops and restaurants include Big Shop, Ice Factory and Factory Sandwich Company.

== Rides and attractions ==
Legoland Japan includes several rides as well as a miniature town featuring iconic landmarks such as Tokyo Station, Kiyomizu Temple, and Nagoya Castle. Most rides were imported, installed and modified to meet Japanese regulations by Sansei Technologies, Inc. Since the opening of Legoland Japan in 2017, Legoland Ninjago World, Legoland Hotel, and Sea Life Aquarium have opened.

=== Creative Workshop ===
Offers various workshops such as Daruma doll crafting, Tensegrity and Caterpillar. Each workshop has a designated difficulty level.

=== Roller coasters ===
Coaster	Opened	Area	Description
The Dragon	2017	Knight's Kingdom	This ride travels around the king's castle, with animated lego figures and a dragon along the way.
Dragon's Apprentice	2017	Knight's Kingdom	Similar to the dragon, but built for younger riders.

=== Amusement rides ===
Ride	Opened	Area	Description
Flying Ninjago	2019	Lego Ninjago World	The ride is on the back of a dragon, giving park guests the option to rotate 360 degrees in the air. The ride reaches heights of up to 22 meters and speeds up to 50 kilometers an hour.
Lloyd's Spinjitzu Spinners	2019	Lego Ninjago World	Containers that spin 360 degrees.
Kai's Sky Masters	2019	Lego Ninjago World	Guests sit in four-person cars and shoot at other vehicles to gain points.
Coast Guard HQ	2017	Lego City	Up to three guests sit in an electric-powered boat while the driver navigates around obstacles.
Splash Battle	2017	Pirate Shores	Eight ships, each seating eight people, compete to avoid getting sprayed with water cannons from the shore and the other ships in the water.
Anchors Away!	2017	Pirate Shores	A rotating pirate ship moving along a U-shaped track.
Merlin's Flying Machines	2017	Knight's Kingdom	Guests pedal themselves far into the air as their car travels around the carousel.
Merlin's Challenge	2017	Knight's Kingdom	Merry-go-round-like ride on a wooden train.
Lost Kingdom Adventure	2017	Adventure	Egyptian-themed ride with a point system based on the number of targets shot with laser guns.
Observation Tower	2017	Bricktopia	A 60-meter tower that offers guests a 360-degree view of the entire park.

=== Other attractions ===
Attraction	Opened	Area	Description
Cole's Rock Climbing Wall	2019	Lego Ninjago World	A small-scale rock climbing wall designed for younger children.
Jay's Lightning Drill	2019	Lego Ninjago World	Guests compete to press buttons on the wall as the light up within 30 seconds.
Ninja Games	2019	Lego Ninjago World	Carnival-style game where guests hit targets with toy ninja stars to win prizes.
Palace Cinema	2017	Lego City	Large indoor movie theater showing 4D Lego movies with features like rain and wind.
Rescue Academy	2017	Lego City	Guests compete to user their fire engine's water guns to put out a fire.
Driving School	2017	Lego City	Riders race their own electric car around the circuit. Each guest receives their own Legoland driver's license.
Miniland	2017	Miniland	This attraction features imagery of 10 different cities in Japan built out of Lego bricks. Over 10 million bricks were used in this walkthrough experience.
Kingdom Games	2017	Knight's Kingdom	Carnival-style games with prizes on the line.
Submarine	2017	Adventure	An underwater attraction where guests can see fish and sea creatures up close with Lego models hidden underwater throughout.
Build and Test	2017	Bricktopia	Guests create and race their unique lego contraptions.
Lego Creative Workshop	2017	Bricktopia	Workshops spanning from simple machines to advanced robots.
Robotic Play Center	2017	Bricktopia	Guests build their own Lego Mindstorm Robot.
Lego Factory Tour	2017	Factory	Guests see firsthand how Lego bricks are produced on an informational walkthrough of this factory.

== Sea Life Nagoya ==
Sea Life Nagoya
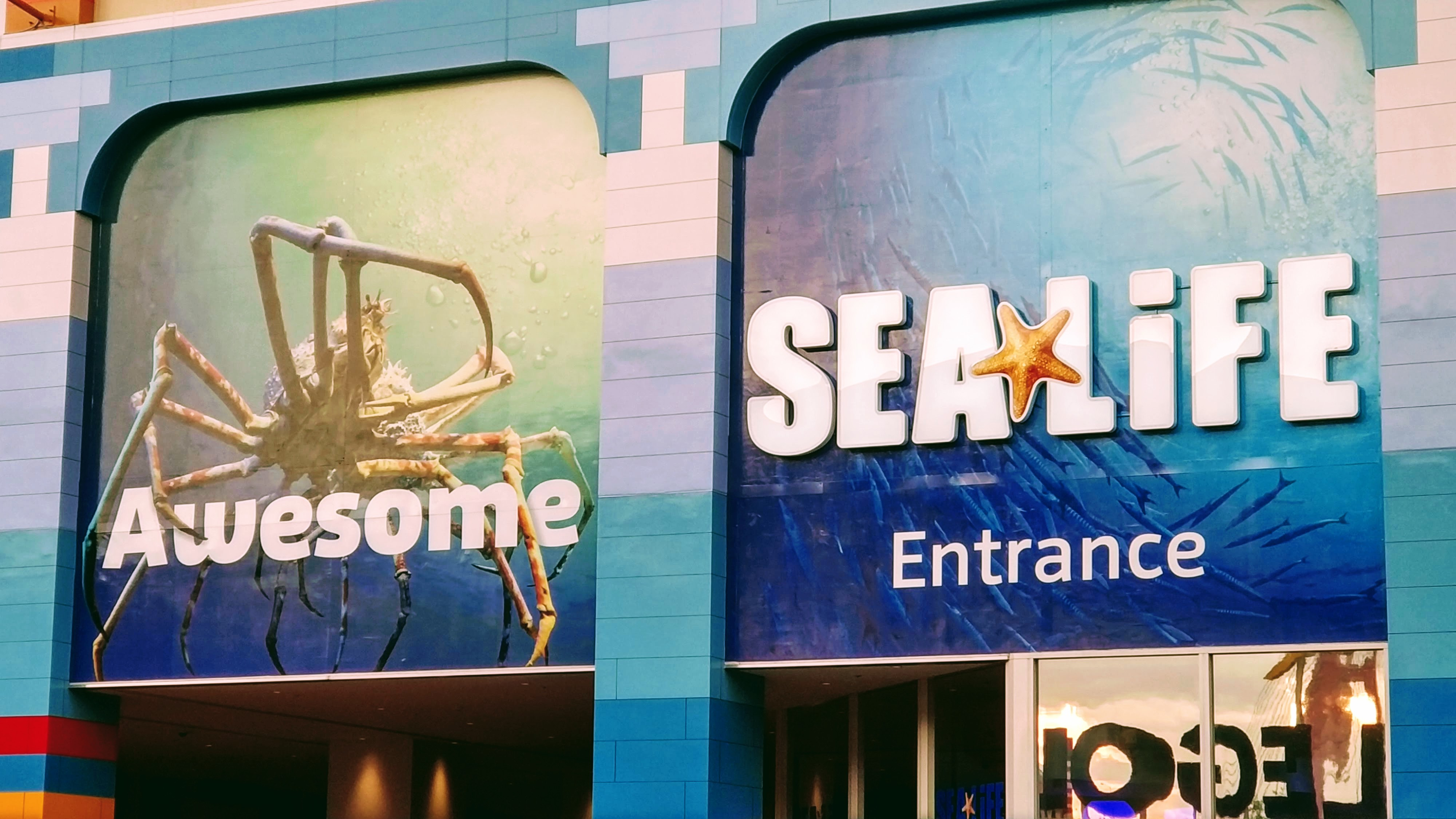
- Entrance of Sea Life Nagoya
- Interactive map of Sea Life Nagoya
- Date opened: April 2018
- Memberships: JAZA
- Major exhibits: "Ryugu-castle (Under Water tunnel)" "Stingray Bay" etc.
- Owner: Sea Life Centres
- Management: LEGOLAND Japan Resort
- Website: www.legoland.jp/en/resort-guide/sealife-nagoya/

Sea Life Nagoya (ja: シーライフ名古屋), opened April 15,2018, is a public aquarium located on the 1st and 2nd floors of the Legoland Japan Hotel. It is a member of the Japanese Association of Zoos and Aquariums (JAZA).

The aquarium is divided into 11 sections, including an exhibition with a Kiso River theme, a Ryugu Castle area with an Urashima Taro theme, and an exhibition related to Lego blocks and seafood. Although part of Legoland Japan Resort, admission is charged separately for the aquarium and theme park. Sea Life Nagoya is the second Sea Life in a Legoland park, opening after Sea Life Aquarium in Legoland California. The aquarium emphasized experiences, with features like backyard tours and animal interactions.

Sea Life Nagoya facilities include Shoaling Ring, Kiso River, Rockpools, Harbour, Seahorse nursery, Coral reef, Stingray Bay, Jellies, Sunken Shipwreck, Ryugu Castle (underwater tunnel), and Amazing Creations.

== Access ==
The park is near Kinjō-futō Station on the Nagoya Rinkai Rapid Transit Aonami Line.

== Stores ==
Legoland Japan Resort offers 12 stores, located throughout the park. These stores have different themes, but guests are able to pick any type of Lego they want at each location.

Store	Opened	Location	Description
Minifigure Market	April 2017	Bricktopia	Mini legos, lego keychains, lego plushes, build your own mini-figure lego.
Pick a Brick	April 2017	Bricktopia	Guests build their own Lego building.
Studio Store	April 2017	Lego City	Lego movies.
Heartlake Shop	April 2017	Lego City	Based on the Lego Girl series.
City Shop	April 2017	Lego City	Part of Driving School, where guests may create or buy Lego cars.
The Corner Shop	April 2017	Factory	Stroller and wheelchair services.
Lost Booty Trading Post	April 2017	Pirate Shores	Pirate Lego souvenirs.
Artefact Shop	April 2017	Adventure	Ancient heritage themed store selling adventure Legos and Lego backpacks.
The Sub Shop	April 2017	Adventure	Part of Submarine Adventure, offers pictures of guests on the ride.
King's Market	April 2017	Knight's Kingdom	Part of Knight's Castle Restaurant, guests may buy Lego castles and dragons.
The Photoshop	April 2017	Main entrance	Guests select their favorite photos from the park's seven locations.
The Big Shop	April 2017	Main entrance	Variety of Legos sold in stores across the park.

== Restaurants ==
The resort offers six restaurants, most of which are based on the theme of the area they are located within.

Date	Restaurant	Location	Description
April 2017	Brick House Burgers	Lego City	Hamburger style restaurant.
April 2017	Factory Sandwich Company	Factory, 2nd floor of Corner Shop	Café offering handmade sandwiches and drinks.
April 2017	Chicken Diner	Bricktopia	Chicken meals, including sandwiches.
April 2017	Coral Reef Pizza and Pasta Buffet	Adventure	Seasonal pasta and pizzas.
April 2017	Knight's Table Restaurant	Knight's Kingdom	Fantasy castle themed restaurant.
April 2017	Oasis Snacks	Adventure	Snacks, including fries, churros, and cheeses.

== See also ==
- 2017 in amusement parks
- Tokyo Disneyland
- Universal Studios Japan
