= Lech Coaster =

Steel roller coaster in Chorzów, Poland

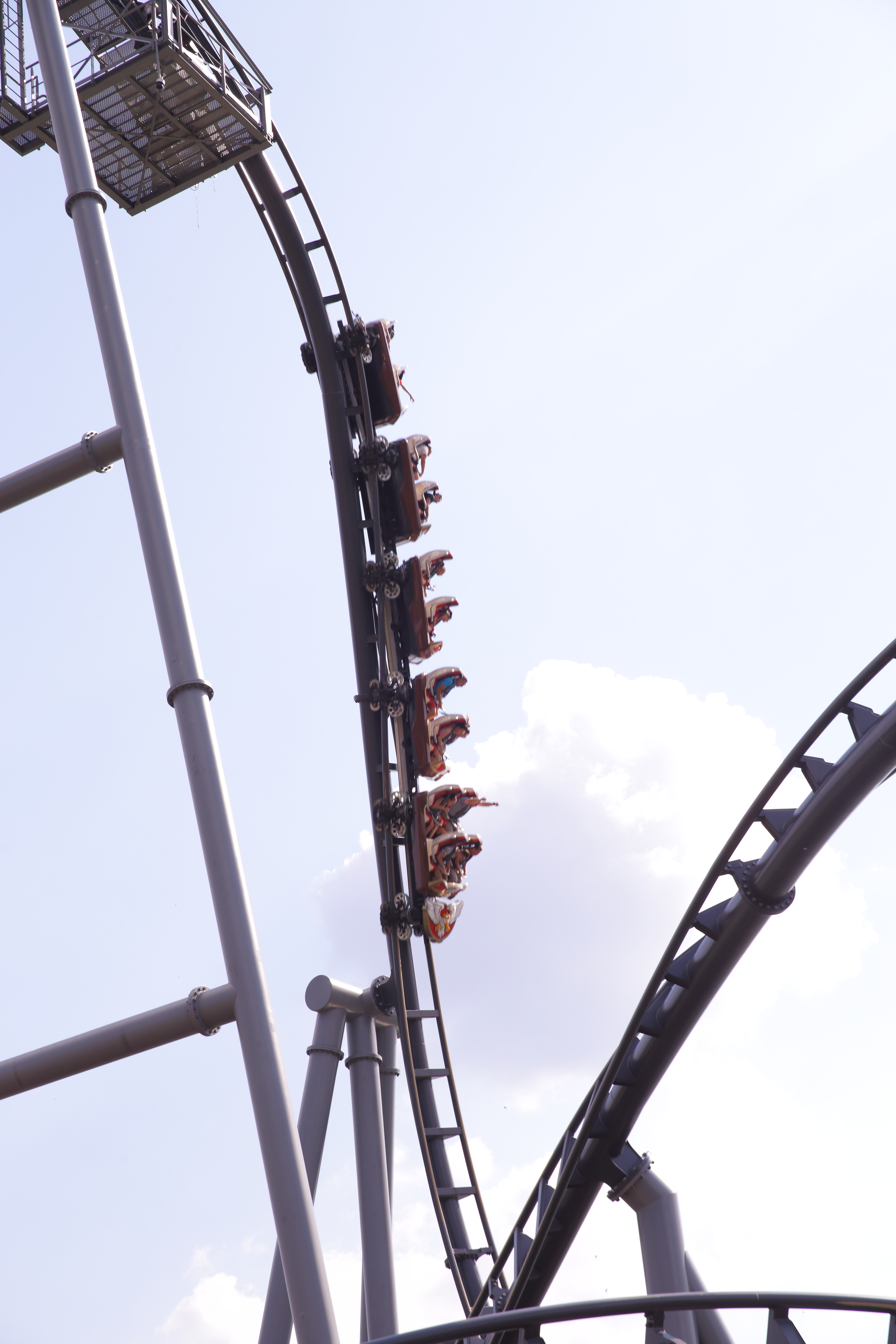

Legendia
- Location: Legendia
- Coordinates: 50.2774°N 18.9928°E
- Status: Operating
- Opening date: July 1, 2017
- Cost: €12 million

General statistics
- Type: Steel
- Manufacturer: Vekoma
- Designer: Benjamin Bloemendaal
- Model: Bermuda Blitz
- Lift/launch system: Chain lift hill
- Height: 40 m (130 ft)
- Length: 908 m (2,979 ft)
- Speed: 95 km/h (59 mph)
- Inversions: 3
- Duration: 1:44
- Capacity: 1000 riders per hour
- Height restriction: 120–195 cm (3 ft 11 in – 6 ft 5 in)
- Trains: 2 trains with 5 cars; riders arranged 2 across in 2 rows for a total of 20 riders per train
- Lech Coaster at RCDB

Lech Coaster is a steel roller coaster located at Legendia in Chorzów, Poland. It was the first Bermuda Blitz coaster by Dutch manufacturer Vekoma and opened on July 1, 2017. The ride stands 40 metres (130 ft) tall, has a maximum speed of 95 kilometres per hour (59 mph), and has a track length of 908 metres (2,979 ft). The ride also features three inversions.

== Characteristics ==
=== Trains ===
Lech uses two trains with five cars each. Each car seats four riders, allowing a total capacity of 20 riders per train. The ride can accommodate 1,000 riders per hour.

=== Track ===
Lech's steel track is 908 metres (2,979 ft) in length and 40 metres (131 ft) in height. The track is black and the supports are grey.

== Ride experience ==
=== Layout ===
Lech Coaster begins by taking a small dip, turning 90 degrees to the right into the 40 metres (131 ft) tall lift hill. Upon reaching the top of the lift hill, riders plunge down a beyond-vertical drop (unknown angle), twisting 90 degrees to the right in the process. After passing through a tunnel and reaching the maximum speed of 95 kilometres per hour (59 mph) at the bottom of the drop, riders enter their first inversion: a reverse sidewinder. Right after, the train turns to the right into a twisted airtime hill, which twists riders to the left. Afterwards, the train will pass through another airtime hill, followed by a corkscrew, which is located right above the main station of the ride. Riders then turn left into an over-banked turn, which then turns right. Afterwards, they pass through another twisted airtime hill, followed immediately by another corkscrew. The train then enters into an outer-banked airtime hill into a 270 degree helix to the left, followed by another twisted airtime hill into a 180 degree turnaround to the left, before stepping up into Lech Coaster's final brake run, turning to the right afterwards to return to the station.

== Awards ==
Golden Ticket Awards: Top steel Roller Coasters
Year									1998	1999
Ranking									–	–
Year	2000	2001	2002	2003	2004	2005	2006	2007	2008	2009
Ranking	–	–	–	–	–	–	–	–	–	–
Year	2010	2011	2012	2013	2014	2015	2016	2017	2018	2019
Ranking	–	–	–	–	–	–	–	–	–	–
Year	2020	2021	2022	2023	2024	2025	2026			
Ranking	N/A	–	–	–	45	43	40 (tie)			

== See also ==
- 2017 in amusement parks
