= Happy Valley Chongqing =

Amusement park in China

- Interactive map of Happy Valley Chongqing
- Location: Chongqing, China
- Coordinates: 29.684553°N 106.508221°E
- Status: Operating
- Opened: July 8, 2017

Attractions
- Roller coasters: 4

Happy Valley Chongqing (simplified Chinese: 重庆欢乐谷; traditional Chinese: 重慶歡樂谷; pinyin: Chóngqìng Huānlè Gǔ) is a theme park in Yubei District, Chongqing, China. Opened on 8 July 2017, it is the seventh installation of the Happy Valley theme park chain.

== Notable rides ==
Name	Type	Manufacturer	Model	Opened	Other statistics
Family Coaster	Steel	Vekoma	Family Boomerang	2017	Length: 607 ft (185 m); Height: 65.6 ft (20.0 m); Speed: 37.3 mph (60.0 km/h)
Flying Wing Coaster	Steel	Bolliger & Mabillard	Wing Coaster	2017	Unknown
Jungle Dragon	Wood	Great Coasters International	Wood Coaster	2017	Length: 3,200 ft (980 m); Height: 100 ft (30 m)
Monte Carlo Track	Steel	Jinma Rides	Mine Train	2017	Unknown
