= Fun-Plex =

Amusement park in Omaha, Nebraska

Coordinates: 41°12′14″N 96°01′13″W

Fun-Plex is an amusement park located at 7003 Q Street in the Ralston neighborhood of Omaha, Nebraska. It is the largest amusement park in Nebraska, Fun-Plex began as “The Kart Ranch” in 1979 with just a go-kart track. In 2015 Fun-Plex put in a brand new water feature called Makana Splash, a water play structure with a 317-gallon bucket that drops water on swimmers. In 2016 Fun-Plex built Nebraska's Only Swim up bar called Breakers Bay Bar. In 2018 Fun-Plex added Rockin’ Rapids, the biggest addition to the park in 40 years. The attraction features two tube slides for single or double riders.

== Incidents ==
On June 25, 2023, a 6 year old boy named Kidus Endrias was in the Motion Ocean when he hit his head and nearly drowned. He was then taken to Bergen Mercy Hospital before arriving at Children’s Hospital and Medical Center and dying there two days later.

== About ==
Rides at Fun-Plex include a slick track, bumper boats, and go-gator kiddie coaster. There is a waterpark with a wave pool, five story waterslides, a lazy river, and a children's pool. Other rides includes the Rock-O-Ride, a Tilt-A-Whirl, as well as a classic carousel and the Balloon Ferris wheel. In 2007, the facility boasted new go-karts and a larger track, as well a new 18-hole miniature golf.

In 2007, a relocated roller coaster named The Big Ohhhhhh!!! was introduced to Fun-Plex. A "Zyklon" coaster by Italian firm Pinfari, it was the state's only major roller coaster until its removal in 2018.

In 2025, the park opened Pirate's Chutes, a pair of body slides culminating with a large drop into the 11' deep splash pool.

In 2026, Fun-Plex acquired a brand new steel roller coaster called Mammoth, taking the present title of Nebraska's only major coaster. It is an "Anaconda 2.0" model manufactured by Italian firm Preston & Barbieri.
