= Legendia =

Amusement Park in Poland

- Previously known as Silesian Amusement Park
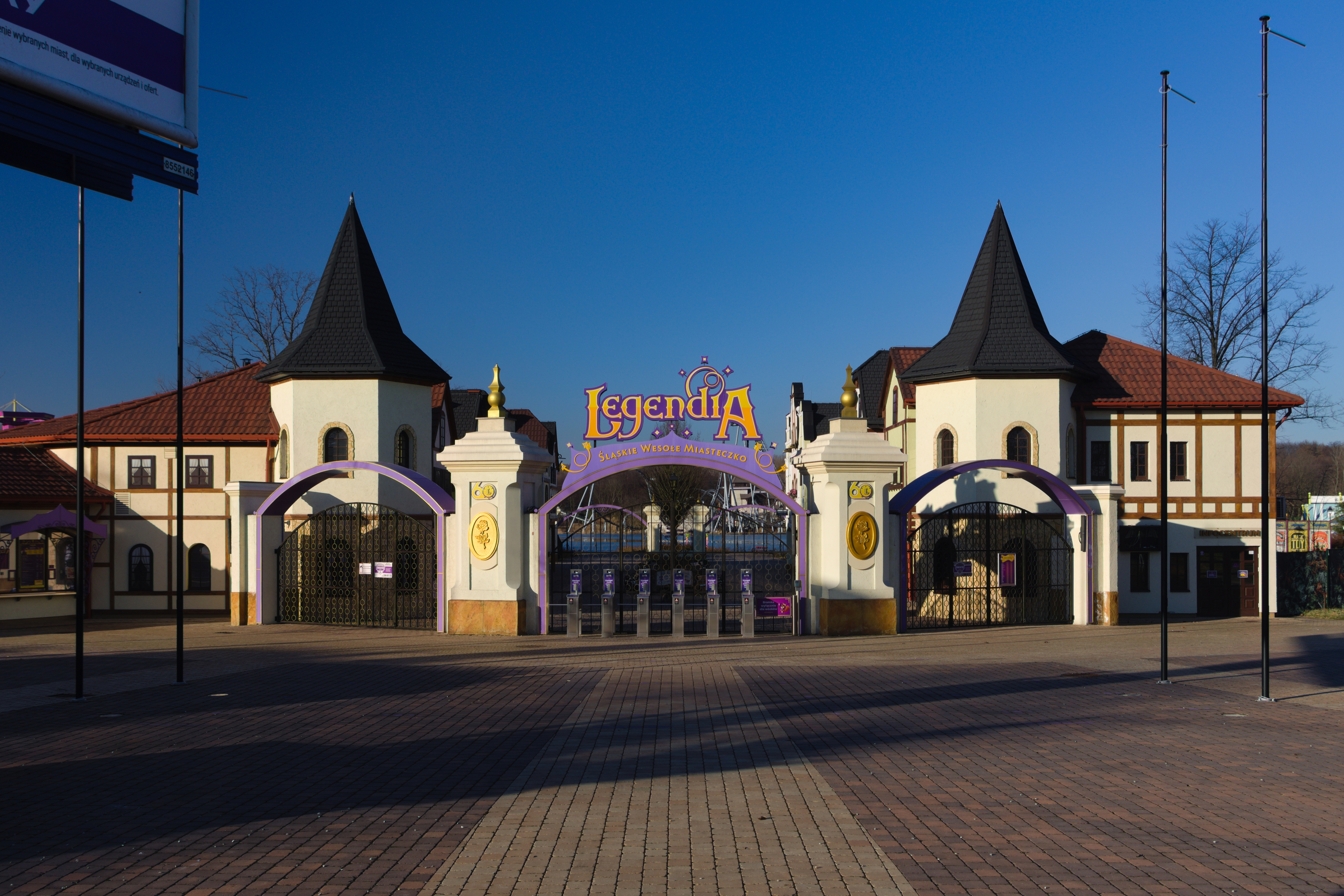
- Legendia park entrance in 2021
- Interactive map of Legendia
- Location: Chorzów, Poland
- Coordinates: 50.2756°N 18.9917°E
- Status: Operating
- Opened: 1959
- Owner: Tatry Mountain Resorts
- Attendance: 253,000 (2008)
- Area: 64.2 acres (26.0 ha)

Attractions
- Roller coasters: 2
- Water rides: Diamond River
- Website: www.legendia.pl/en/

Legendia (a.k.a. Silesian Amusement Park, Polish: Śląskie Wesołe Miasteczko) is an amusement park located within Silesian Park in the center of the Metropolis GZM, Poland. It has an area of 26 ha (64 acres). In 2008, the park saw 253,000 visitors.

In 2015, the Slovak company Tatry Mountain Resorts acquired Silesian Amusement Park. They renamed the park "Legendia" and modified many of its existing attractions. The park is now themed to "Legends".

== History ==
In 1956, construction of the Silesian Amusement Park started. It opened in 1959.

In 1985, a Ferris wheel named “Gwiazda Duża” was installed (now Legendia Flower).

In 2013, 26 rides were bought from Denmark's Sommerland Syd.

In 2015, Tatra Mountain Resort became a new investor in Silesian Amusement Park. It planned to invest PLN 117 million into the park.

In 2017, because of change of layout and attractions, the park changed its name to Legendia Śląskie Wesołe Miasteczko.

On 1 July 2017 Lech Coaster opened as the tallest, longest and fastest roller coaster in Poland. Hyperion at nearby Energylandia has since broken these records.

== Attractions ==
As of 2017, Legendia has about 40 attractions.

Roller Coasters
Diabelska pętla
Lech Coaster
