= Batala (disambiguation) =

Batala is a municipal corporation in Gurdaspur district in the state of Punjab, India.

Batala may also refer to:

- Batala Assembly Constituency in Punjab, India
- Batala Colony, an area in southern Faisalabad, Pakistan
- Batala (music), an international music group

== See also ==
- Battala, an area of Serampore, West Bengal, India
- Bathala, a Philippine deity
- Bathala (island), an island of the Maldives
- Batalha (disambiguation)
- Batalla, a surname (including a list of persons with the name)
