= Batalha =

Batalha (Portuguese for battle) may refer to:

Portugal

- Batalha, Portugal, a municipality
- Batalha Monastery (officially Mosteiro Santa Maria da Vitória), monastery in Batalha, Portugal
- Batalha Square, a historical public square in the city of Porto

Brazil

- Batalha, Alagoas, municipality in Alagoas, Brazil (15,000 inhabitants)
- Batalha, Piauí, municipality in Piauí, Brazil
- Batalha River, river in São Paulo

People

- José Lodi Batalha, Brazilian footballer
- Martha Batalha, Brazilian journalist
- Natasha Batalha, Brazilian-American astronomer, daughter of Natalie
- Natalie Batalha, American astronomer, mother of Natasha
- Rui Batalha, Portuguese footballer
