= Casa Correia de Matos =

Historic house in Guimarães, Portugal

Correia de Matos House
- Casa Correia de Matos
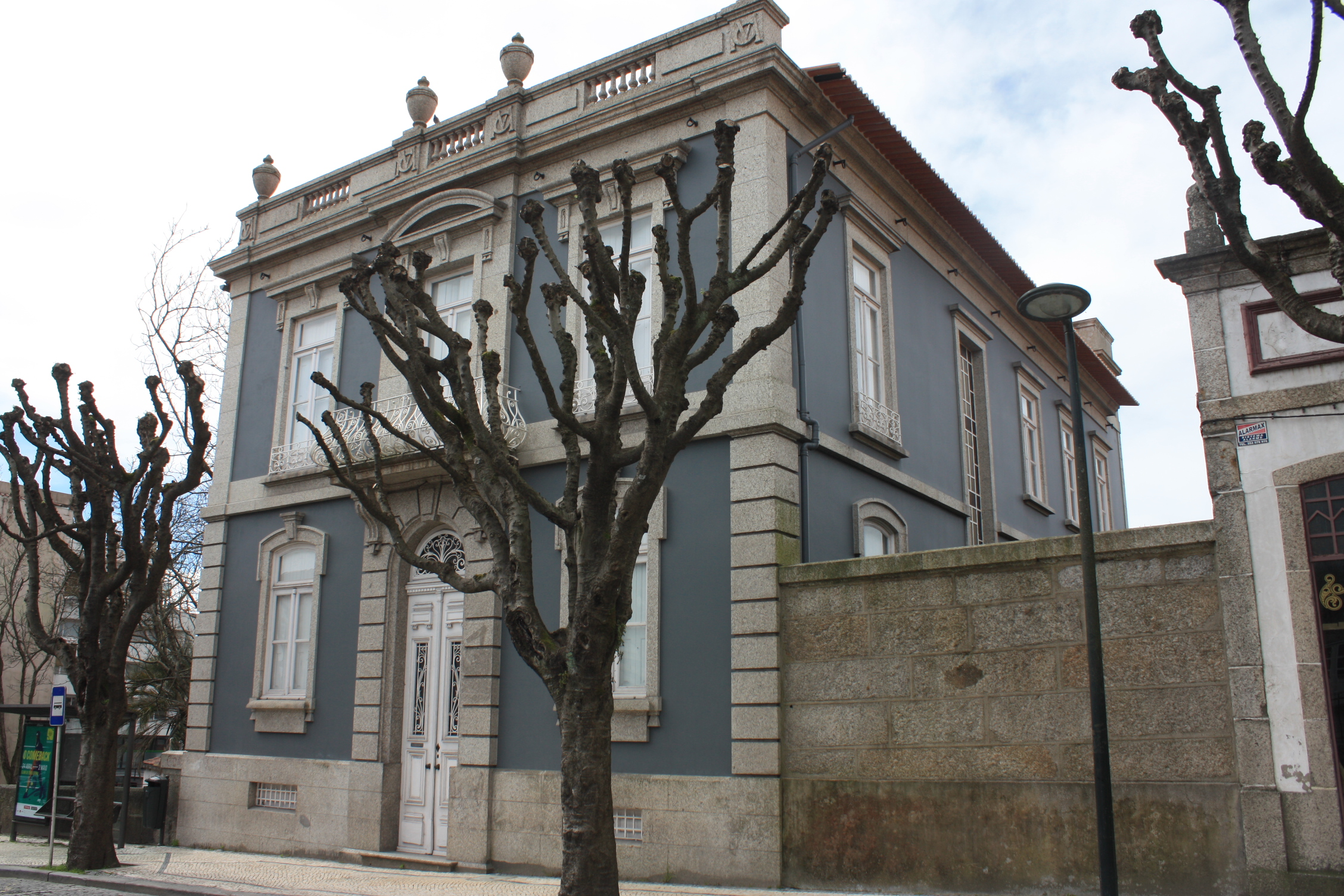
- Correia de Matos House in March 2021
- Interactive map of the Correia de Matos House area

General information
- Status: Inserted inside the GHC
- Architectural style: Mix of Neoclassical, Beaux-Arts and Italianate
- Classification: Protected landmark
- Location: Guimarães, Portugal
- Coordinates: 41.4399°N 8.29543°W
- Construction started: 1902
- Renovated: 2018-2019

Technical details
- Floor count: 4

Design and construction
- Architect: José Marques da Silva

The Correia de Matos House (Portuguese: Casa Correia de Matos) is a 20th-century house in Guimarães, Portugal.

== Description ==
Rectangular in plan and uniform in volume, the house features a hipped roof. The facades are two (front) and three (back and sides) stories high, with the lower level clad in granite masonry and the upper levels plastered and painted white, except for the central section of the main facade, which is also clad in granite. The facades are characterized by a base, Tuscan pilaster corners, and a frieze and cornice at the top. The main facade, facing west, is two stories high, divided by a frieze and granite, and topped with a balustraded parapet featuring acroteria inscribed with the initials "CM" for Correia Matos, the family name, and crowned by granite urns.

At the center of the main facade is a round-arched portal with a prominent frame and keystone, protected by double wooden doors with padded panels and a transom window with metal elements painted brown. Above the portal is a balcony window with a straight lintel, topped by a curved pediment supported by three corbels, with a stone basin resting on two corbels, and a wrought iron guardrail. Flanking the portal are two flat-arched windows with granite frames and central keystones; these are topped by two more balcony windows with straight lintels and central keystones, surmounted by a cornice resting on two central corbels and a small wrought iron guardrail.

The side facades are three stories high, divided by a granite frieze, and feature several rectangular windows with differentiated granite frames. The house is surrounded by a small grassy field, apart from the front facade, that faces the Afonso Henriques Avenue.

== History ==
=== Background ===
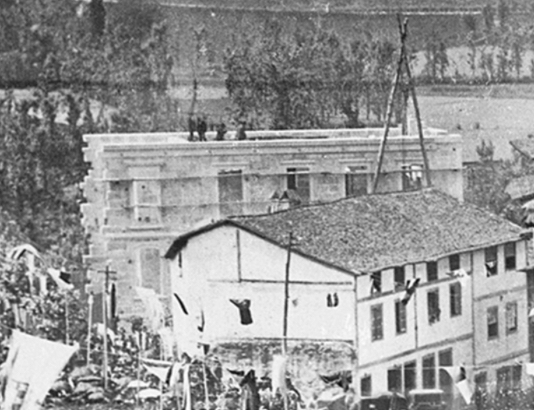
The Correia de Matos House still under construction, 1902

The Casa Correia de Matos was constructed on Afonso Henriques Avenue, a road established in the 1890s to connect the city to the train station, which had opened in 1884. When the house's construction started in 1902, the avenue had only one other building, the Vila Flor Palace, making it a prime location for new residential and industrial developments. This lack of surrounding structures allowed architect Marques da Silva to use the house as an experimental project, blending various architectural styles such as Beaux-Arts, Italianate, and Neoclassical.

=== Construction and aftermath ===
The house was built in 1902 on the northern part of Afonso Henriques Avenue. At that time, locals referred to it as Rua Nova (New Street) to distinguish it from the nearby D. João IV Avenue, a name adopted due to its construction just a few years earlier. The house was built by architect Marques da Silva for the Correia de Matos family, and it was his first project in Guimarães, as he later designing other local landmarks such as the Martins Sarmento Society Building, the city market and the Penha Sanctuary.
