= José Marques da Silva =

Portuguese architect

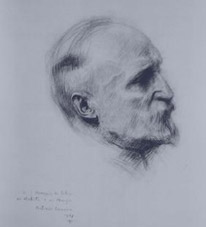
- Born: 18 October 1869; Porto, Portugal
- Died: 6 June 1947 (aged 77); Porto, Portugal
- Occupations: Architect, educator

Signature
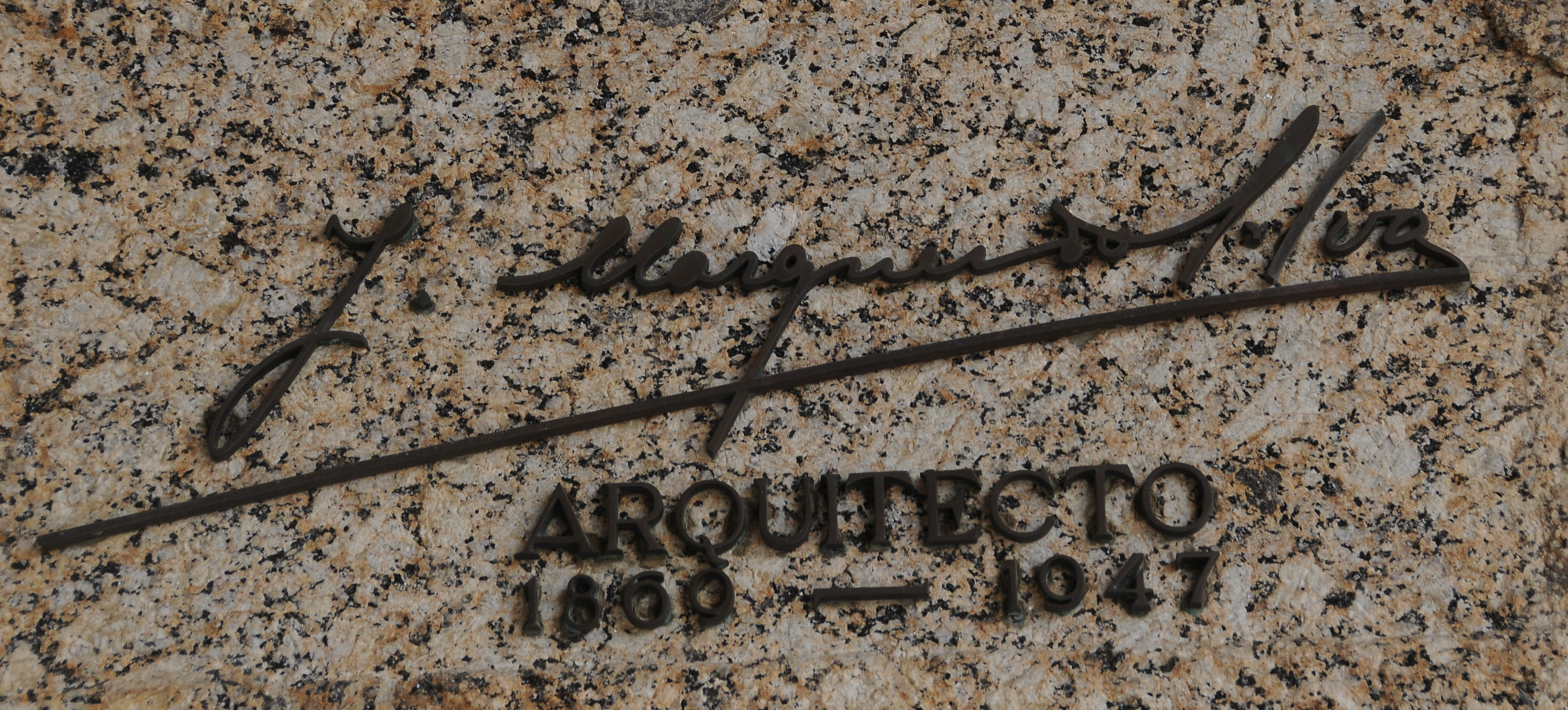

José Marques da Silva (18 October 1869 – 6 June 1947) was a Portuguese architect and educator.

== Life and work ==
=== Training ===
José Marques da Silva was born at 113 Rua de Costa Cabral, in Porto, on 18 October 1869. His architectural training began at the Porto Academy of Fine Arts, where his teachers were, among others, António Geraldes da Silva Sardinha, João Marques de Oliveira and António Soares dos Reis. In 1889 he left for Paris in order to enter the École nationale supérieure des Beaux-Arts, and remained in the city until he received the French Government designation of Graduate Architect on 10 December 1896.

During his time in Paris, Marques da Silva did the majority of his academic work in a free atelier external to the School under the direction of Victor Laloux, resulting in some notable architectural drawings. At the time this atelier was attended by an international community of architecture students, including Charles Lemaresquier, future successor of Victor Laloux; Paul Norman, who would win the Grand Prix of 1891; Charles Butler, the atelier's first American graduate in 1897; and also his fellow-countryman Miguel Ventura Terra. The José Marques da Silva Foundation Institute holds a unique set of documents dating from this period, consisting of 67 architectural drawings, an important and enlightening record of fin-de-siècle architectural practices within the Beaux-Arts tradition.

=== Architectural practice ===
Marques da Silva returned to Portugal in 1896, and his intense professional activities quickly earned him public recognition. At the Paris Universal Exposition of 1900 he received the silver medal and at the Rio de Janeiro Exposition of 1908 he was awarded the gold medal for his architectural achievements.

In 1908 he was awarded the Official Degree of the Santiago [St James] Order of Merit for Science, Literature and Art. With designs such as the São Bento railway station (1896), the São João National Theatre (1910), the Four Seasons Building (1905), the Alexandre Herculano High School (1914), the Rodrigues de Freitas High School (1919), the Nascimento Department Store (1914), the Casa de Serralves (1925–1943), and the Monument to the Heroes of the Peninsular War (1909), he shaped the face of his home city of Porto. In addition, his activities extended to other areas in the north of the country, in particular Guimarães, a city for which he would design several important buildings such as the headquarters of the Martins Sarmento Society, the Market Hall, the Penha Sanctuary and his first project there, the Casa Correia de Matos. His work, at a moment of change in construction practices, combined the values of the Beaux-Arts tradition with the elements of reason, resulting in practical designs adapted to the mechanics of modern life, with his own individual way of understanding the building of the city.

=== Teaching ===
Marques da Silva's teaching activities began in 1900, as Professor of Drawing and Modelling in the Porto Industrial and Commercial Institute. In 1906 he was appointed Professor of Architecture at the Porto Academy of Fine Arts, later coming to occupy the post of Director of the (as it was then known) Porto School of Fine Arts (1913–1914; 1918–1939). Among his students and later employees was Rogério de Azevedo. He was also Director and Professor of the Soares dos Reis School of Applied Art (1914–1930).

Design was the driving force of his teaching, both as a central tool of project practice, and as a basis for the transmission of reliable methodological processes while at the same time responding to the multiple demands of society. This strategy earned him the respect of several generations of modern architects who, starting from the academic basis established by Marques da Silva, learned how to reinvent the architectural practice of Porto.

=== Legacy ===
Marques da Silva died on 6 June 1947, at his home in the Praça Marquês de Pombal, in Porto. In his many areas of activity, this scholar of the Academies of Fine Arts of Lisbon and Porto, board member of the Society of Fine Arts, and founder member of the Society of Northern Architects, left a lasting legacy in the architectural culture of Porto, in the city's landscape, in the culture of architectural design, in teaching practices, and in a certain way of thinking about and practising architecture which was consolidated in Porto during the 20th century.

The estate of Marques da Silva was bequeathed to the University of Porto by his daughter and son-in-law, Maria José Marques da Silva (1914–1994) and David Moreira da Silva (1909–2002), themselves also architects, through the creation of the Marques da Silva Institute. In 1996, the university founded the Architect José Marques da Silva Institute, and in July 2009 the decision was made to transform the institute into a private foundation, the Architect José Marques da Silva Foundation Institute (FIMS), whose mission is to promote the scientific, cultural, pedagogical and artistic heritage of the architect José Marques da Silva, in the context of his time and in relation to the modern culture of which he was a precursor. The Foundation, based in the architect's own Residence-Atelier and next to the Lopes Martins family mansion, as well as occupying a pavilion in the large garden, houses the literary, artistic, architectural and town planning collection of the architects Maria José Marques da Silva Martins and David Moreira da Silva. FIMS coordinates the conservation, evaluation and handling of the information with its research and dissemination, and is open to receiving or incorporating other heritage-related items of historical, scientific, artistic or documentary value, preferably referring to architecture and urban planning in Porto and Portugal. The collections and archives of many other architects have been donated to FIMS over recent years.

In May 2011, the Sociedade de Transportes Colectivos do Porto [Porto Public Transport Society], in collaboration with the Marques da Silva Foundation, paid tribute by providing information to passengers on the various buildings designed by Marques da Silva on the route of Line 22 of the Electric Trams of Porto.

== List of completed works ==
- São Bento railway station (1896–1916), in the Praça de Almeida Garrett, Porto
- "O Comércio do Porto" Housing Estate (1899–1905), in the Rua da Constituição/ Rua de Serpa Pinto, Porto
- Augusto Leite da Silva Guimarães House (1899), in the Rua Latino Coelho/ Rua de Gil Vicente, Porto
- Clemente A. M. Lobo Mausoleum (1900), Agramonte Cemetery, Porto
- Martins Sarmento Society Building for the Sociedade Martins Sarmento (1901–1908) and (1934–1967), Guimarães
- David Soares da Silva Moreira, Two Houses (1904), in the Rua D. João IV/ Rua de Fernandes Tomás
- Four Seasons Building (1905), in the Rua das Carmelitas, Porto
- Public Works Building (1905), Braga
- Marques da Silva House and Atelier (1909), in the Praça do Marquês de Pombal, Porto
- Monument to the Heroes of the Peninsular War Monumento aos Heróis da Guerra Peninsular (1909), also known as the Boavista Monument, in the Praça Mouzinho de Albuquerque, Porto
- S. João National Theatre (1910–1920), in the Praça da Batalha, Porto
- Casa Correia de Matos (1912), Guimarães
- Grandes Armazéns Nascimento Department Store, now the Galerias Palladium (1914–1927), corner of the Rua de Santa Catarina and Passos Manuel, Porto
- Alexandre Herculano High School Liceu Alexandre Herculano (1914–1931), in the Avenida de Camilo, Porto
- Conselheiro Pedro Araújo Mansion (1917), in the Rua do Campo Alegre, Porto
- Conde Vizela Palace (1917–1923), in the Rua das Carmelitas/ Rua do Conde de Vizela/ Rua de Cândido dos Reis, Porto
- "A Nacional" Insurance Company Building (1919–1924), in the Avenida dos Aliados, Porto
- Rodrigues de Freitas High School (1918–1932), in the Praça de Pedro Nunes, Porto
- António Enes Bagana Building (1919), in the Rua do Rosário, Porto
- Tomb of José Lopes Martins (1921), Lapa Cemetery, Porto
- Casa da Espinhosa (1921–1923), Guimarães
- Tomb of Ramiro Magalhães (1922), Agramonte Cemetery, Porto
- Joaquim Emílio Pinto Leite Building (1922), in the Avenida dos Aliados, Porto
- Jornal de Notícias Building (1925), in the Avenida dos Aliados, Porto
- Revenue Building (1925–1928), in the Rua de Alexandre Braga, Porto
- Serralves House and Gardens (1925–1943), in the Rua de Serralves, Porto
- House of Joaquim Gouveia Allen (1927), in the Rua de António Cardoso, Porto
- Market Hall (1927–1947), Guimarães
- Penha Sanctuary Santuário da Penha (1930–1947), Guimarães
- Quinta do Mata-Sete [Farm] (1935), Serralves Gardens, in the Rua de D. João de Castro, Porto
- Building in the Rua Barjona de Freitas (1940), Barcelos
- Temple of São Torcato, Guimarães

== Gallery ==
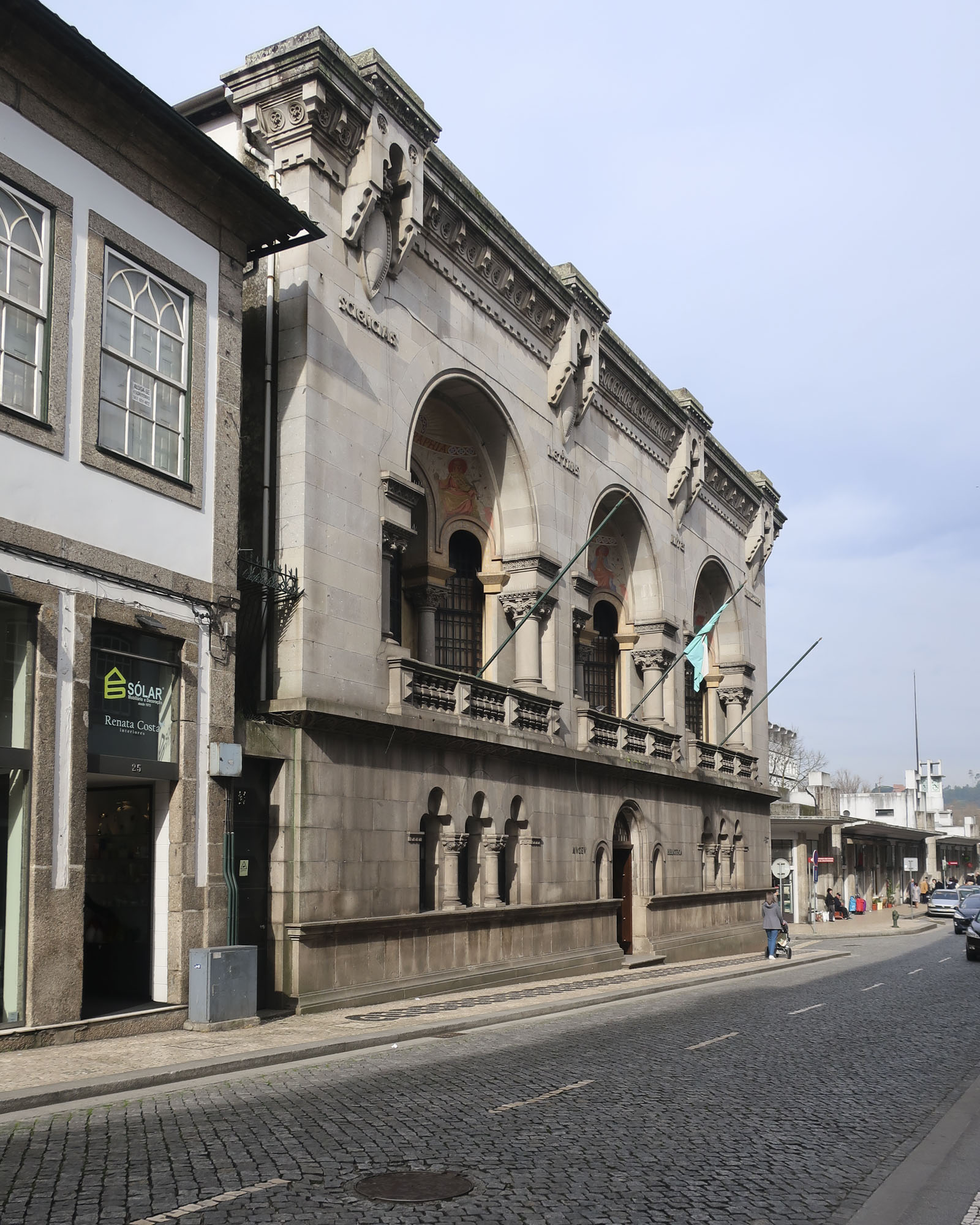
Martins Sarmento Society Building, Guimarães

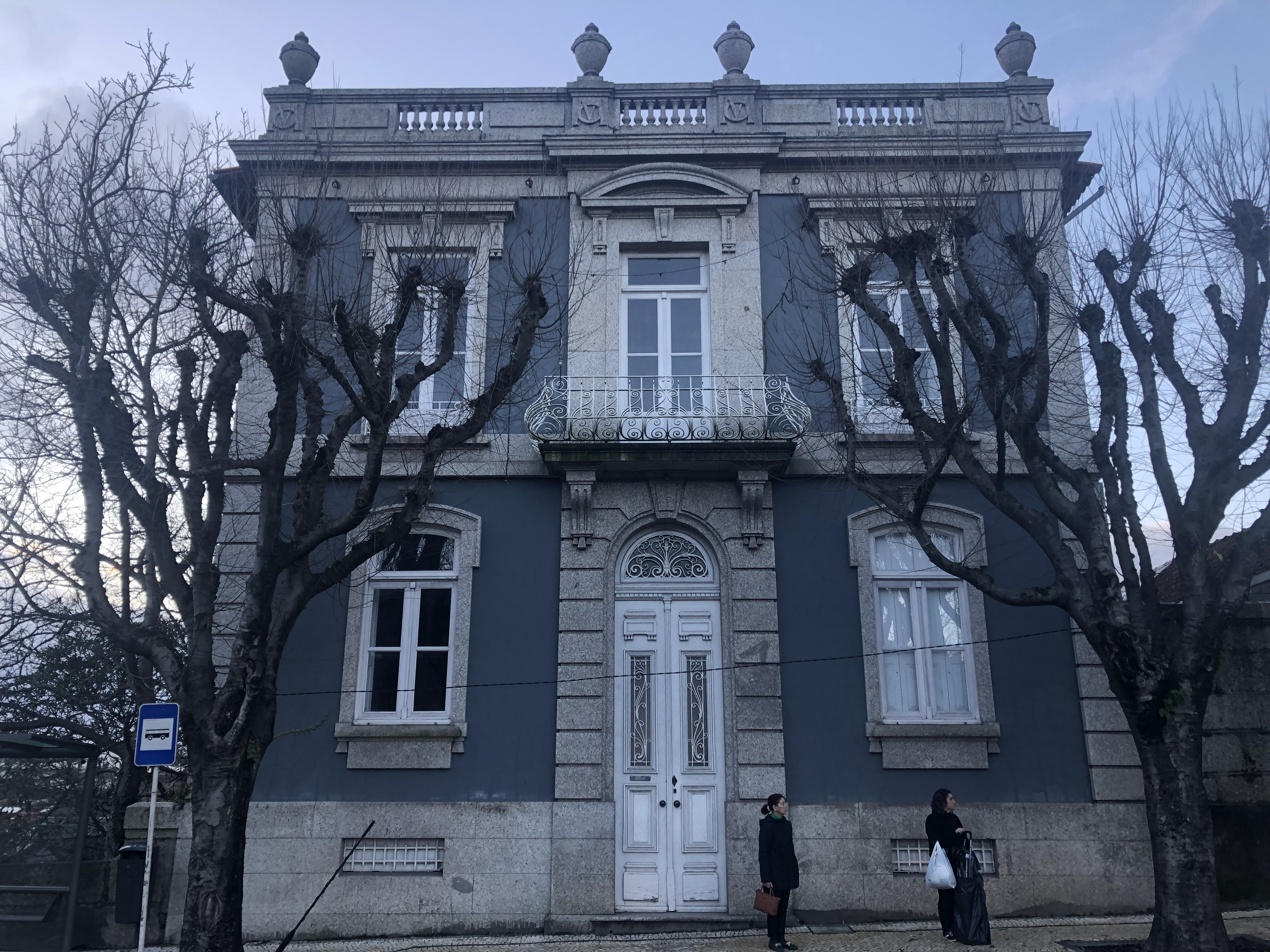
Casa Correia de Matos, Guimarães

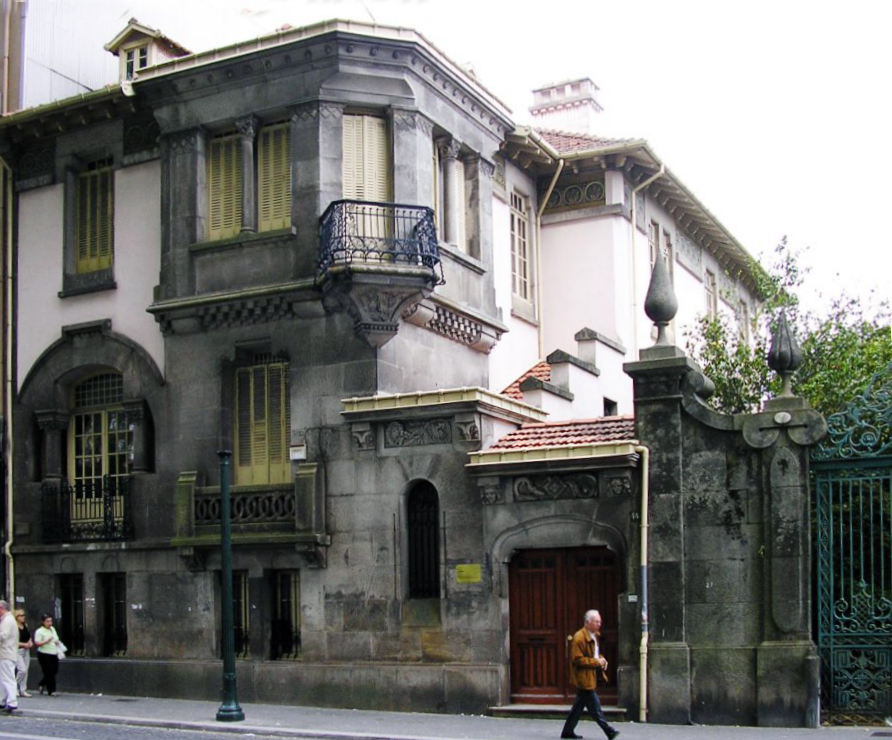
Marques da Silva House and Atelier, Porto

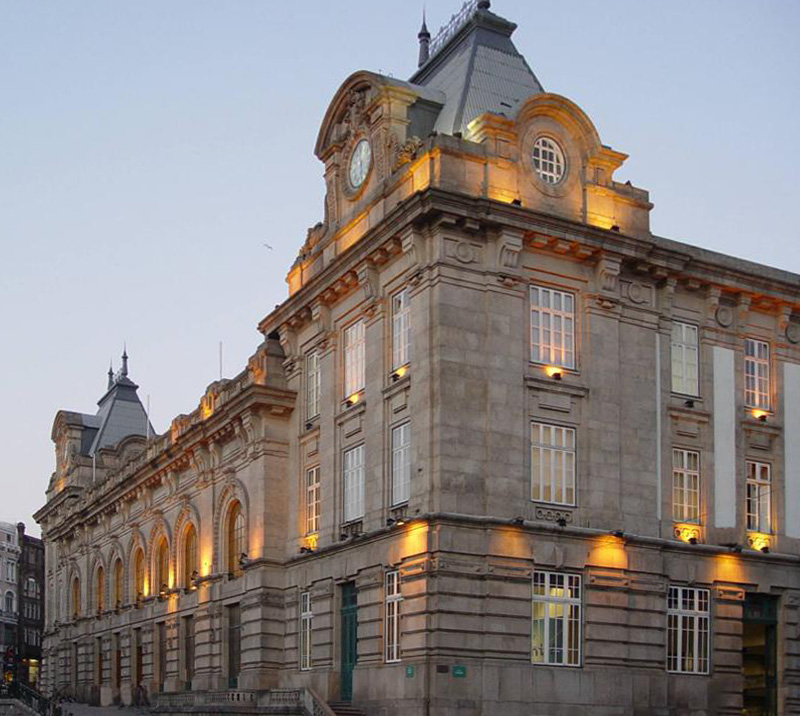
São Bento railway station building, Porto

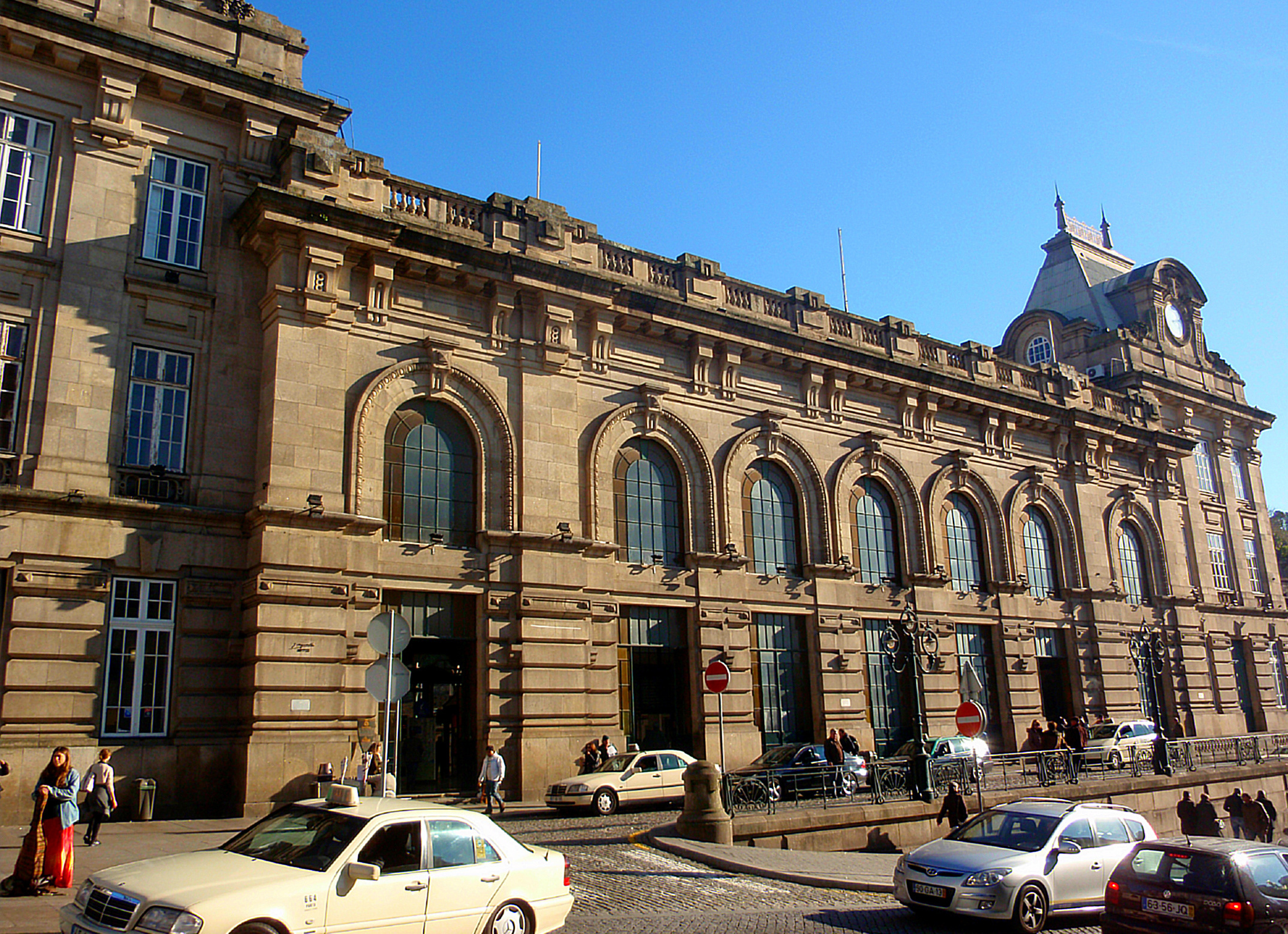
São Bento railway station building, Porto

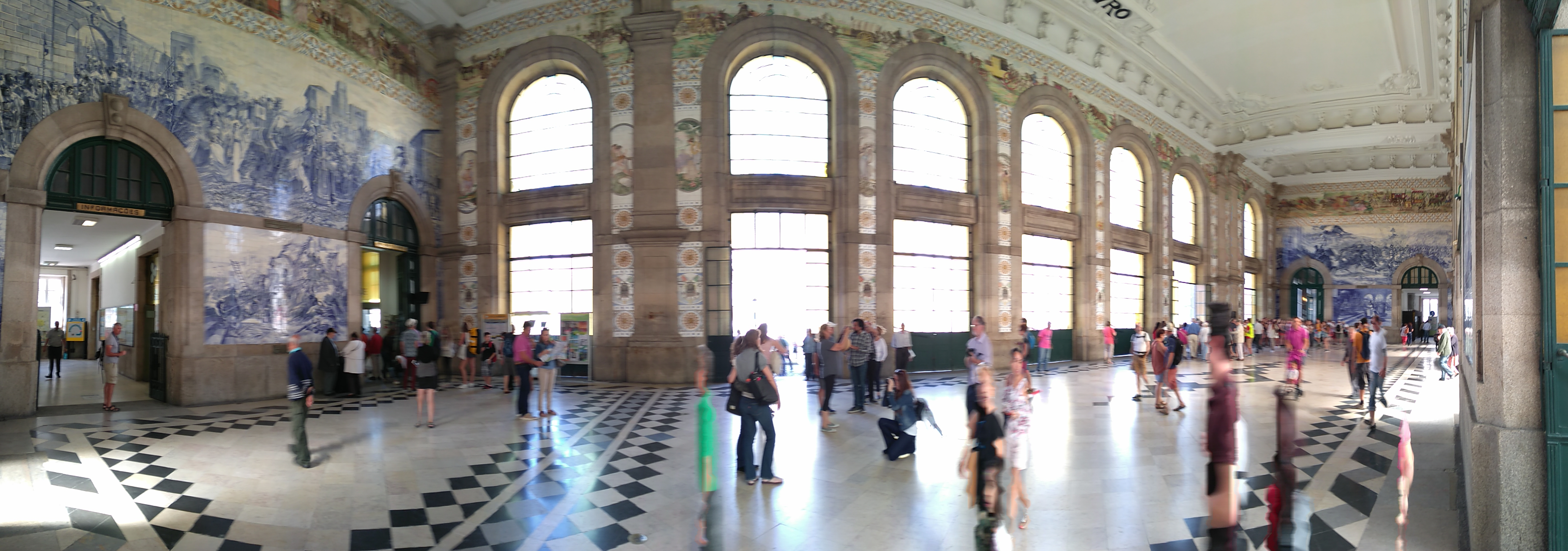
São Bento railway station building, Porto

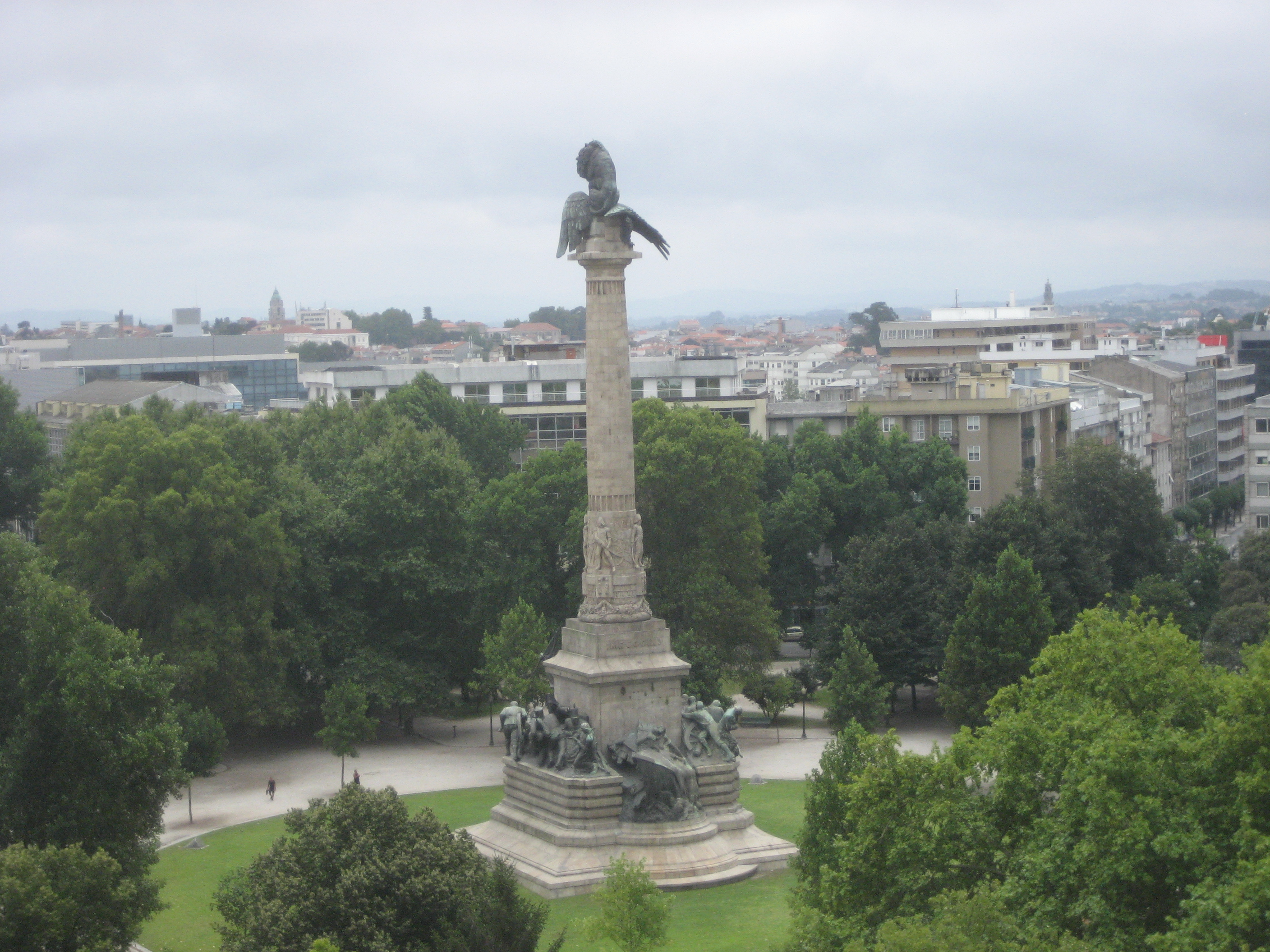
Boavista Monument, Porto

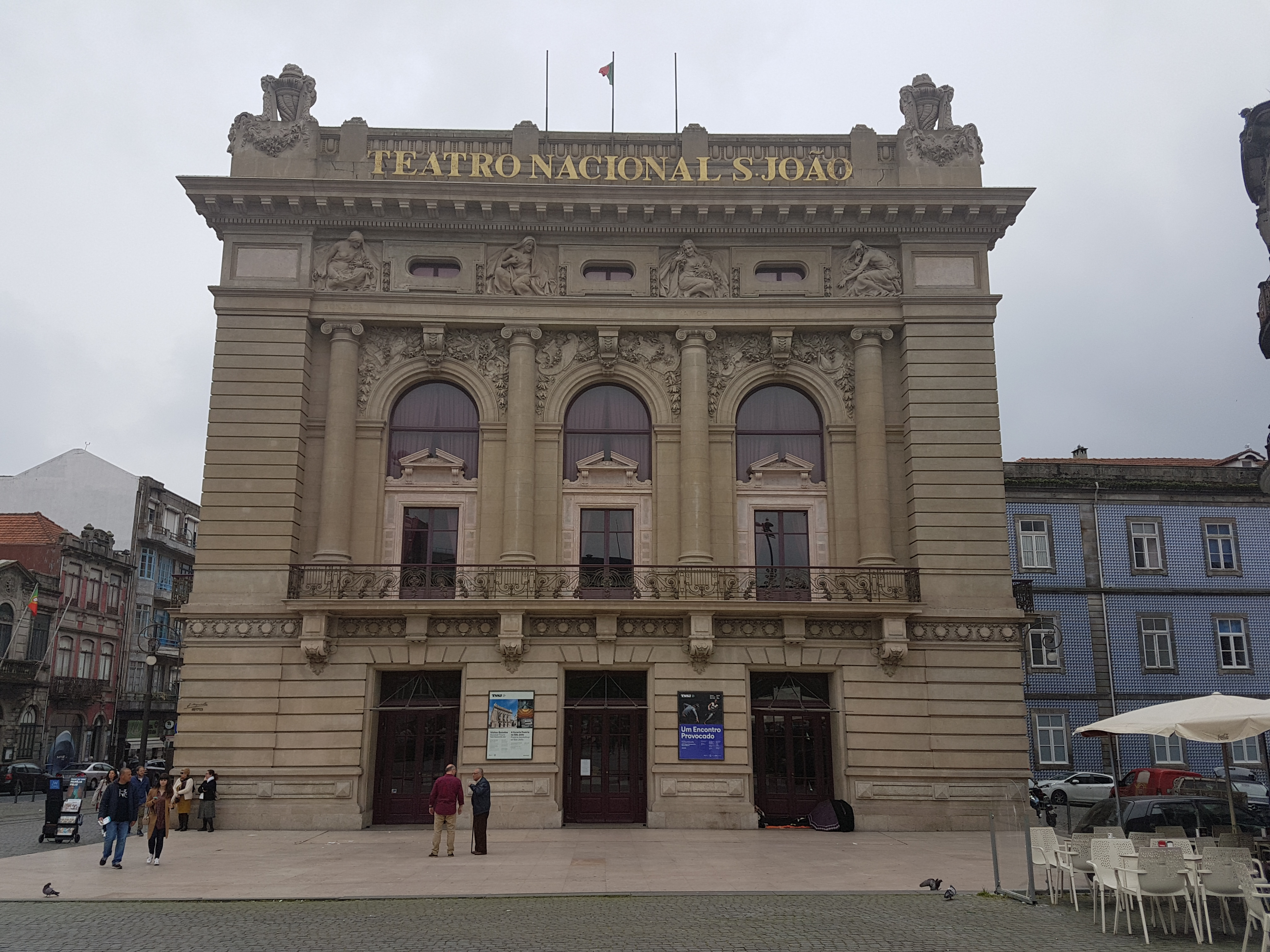
São João National Theatre, Porto

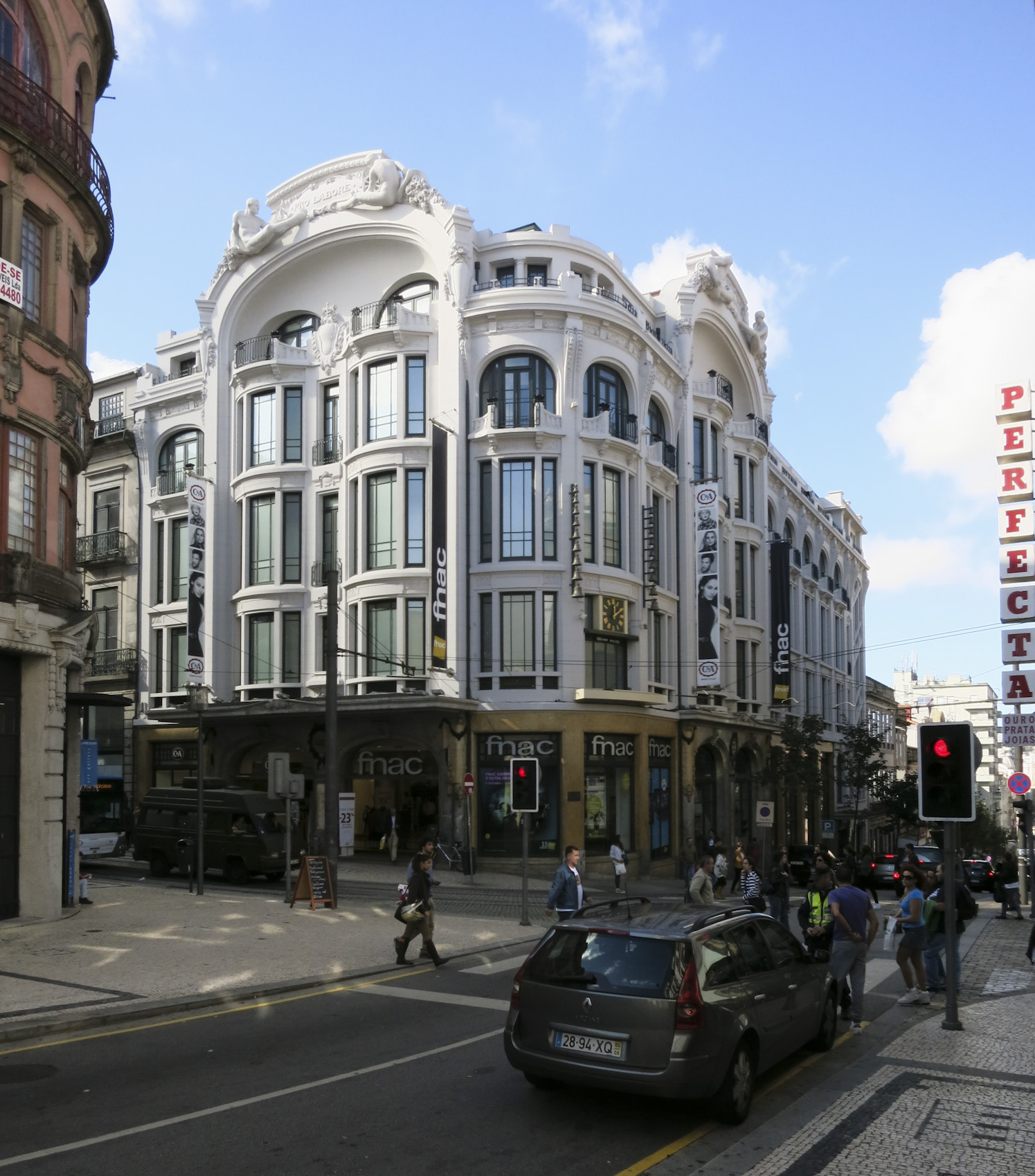
Nascimento Department Store, Porto

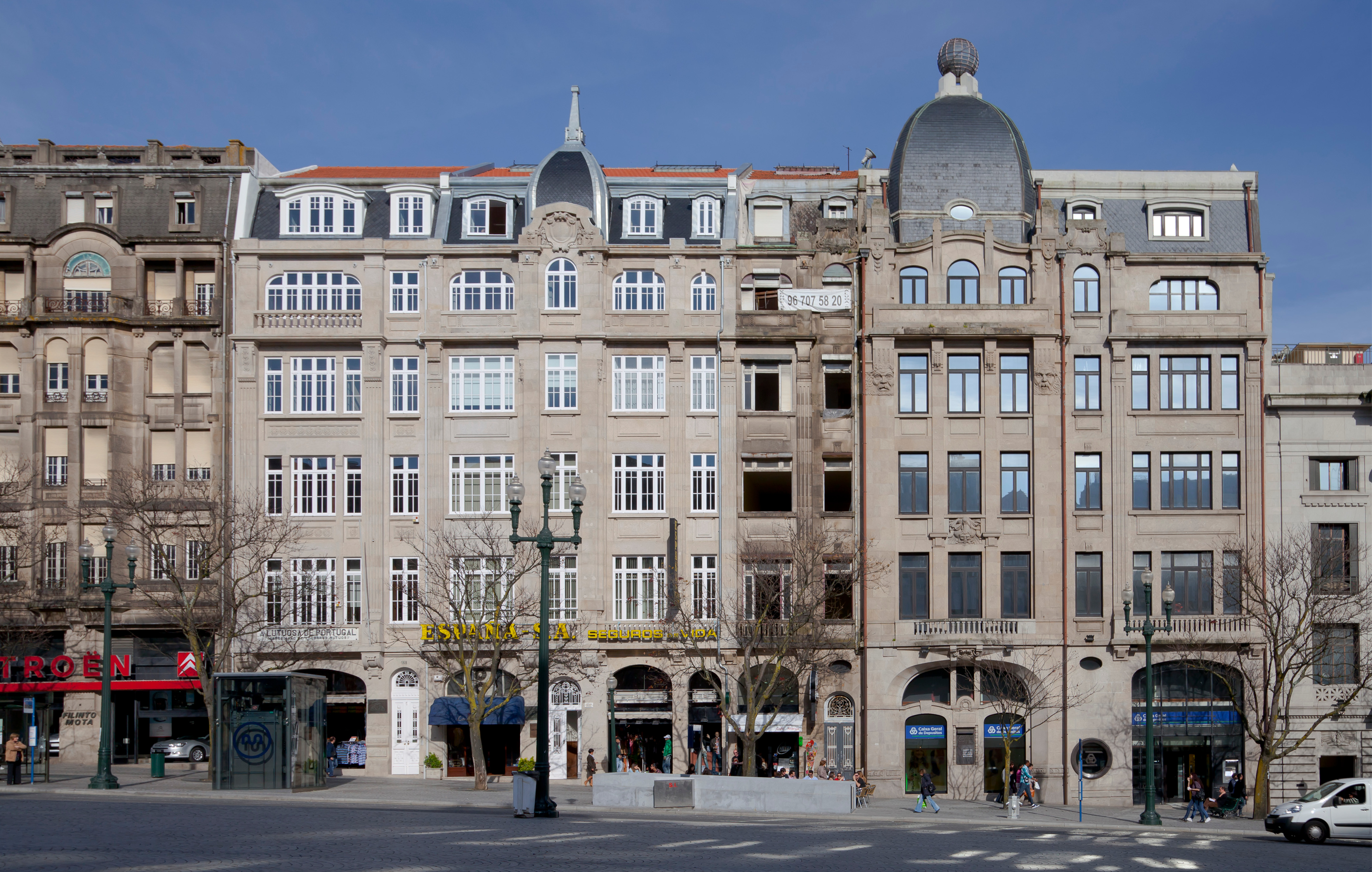
Jornal de NotÍcias building, Porto

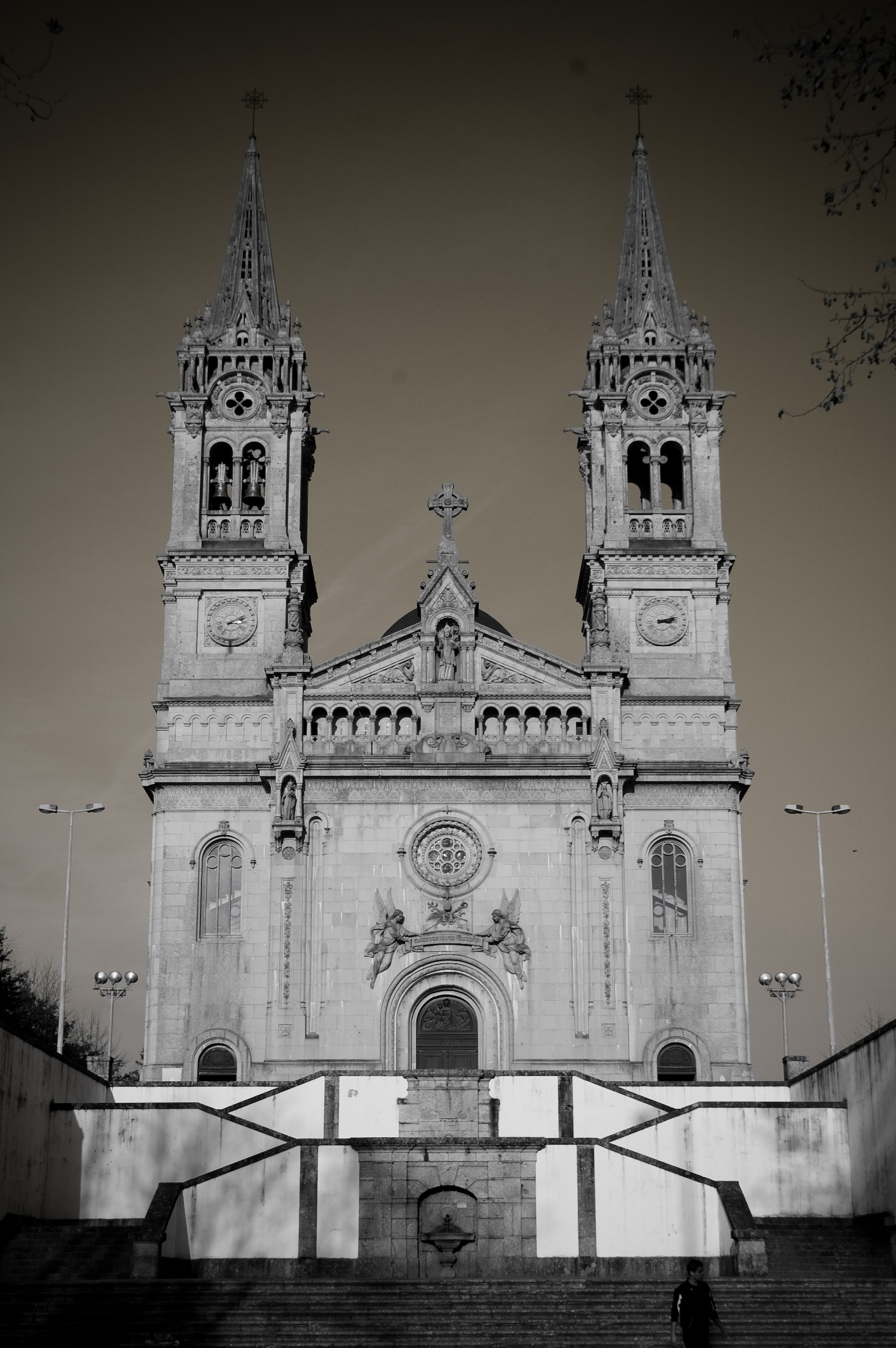
Santuário de São Torcato

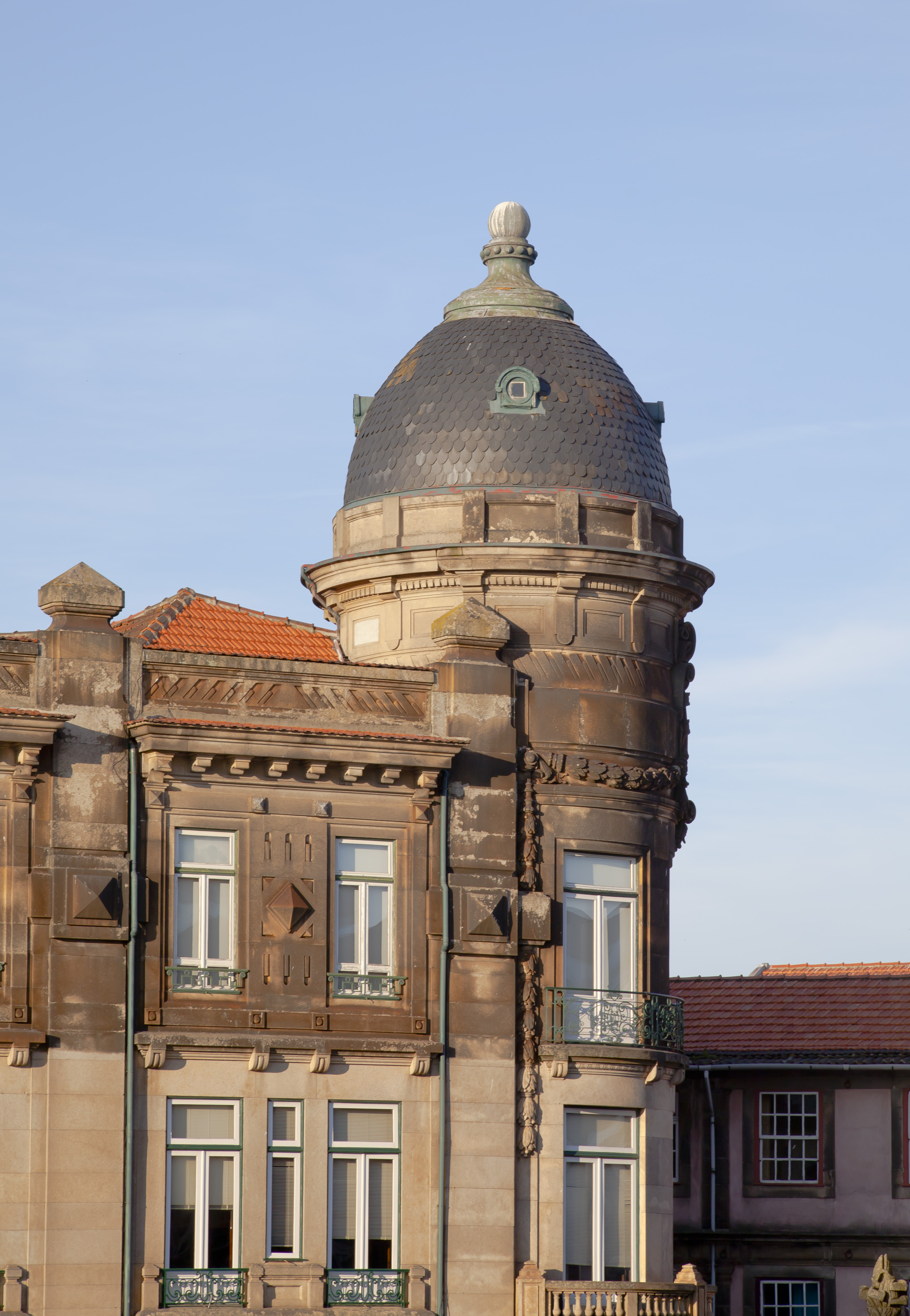
Palácio Conde de Vizela

== Bibliography ==
- Cardoso, António O Arquitecto José Marques da Silva e a arquitectura no Norte do País na primeira metade do séc. XX, 2.ª edição, Porto, Faculdade de Arquitectura da Universidade do Porto, 1997, 793 pp.
- Cardoso, António, et al., J. Marques da Silva arquitecto 1869–1947, Porto, Secção Regional do Norte da Associação dos Arquitectos Portugueses, 1986.
- Cardoso, António, Estação S. Bento, Marques da Silva, Porto, Instituto Arquitecto José Marques da Silva, 2007.
- Carneiro, Luís Soares, A Estranheza da Estípite. Marques da Silva e o(s) Teatro(s) de S. João, Porto, FIMS, 2010.
- Mesquita, Mário João (coord.), Marques da Silva, o aluno, o professor, o arquitecto, Porto, IMS-Faup, [2006].
- Tavares, André, Os fantasmas de Serralves, Porto, Dafne Editora, 2007.
- Tavares, André, Em Granito. A arquitectura de Marques da Silva em Guimarães, Porto, FIMS, 2010.
- Vasconcelos, Domingas, A Praça do Marquês de Pombal na Cidade do Porto, das suas origens até à construção da Igreja da Senhora da Conceição, Porto, Faup-publicações, 2008, pp. 117–118.
