= Martins Sarmento =

Portuguese archaeologist (1833–1899)

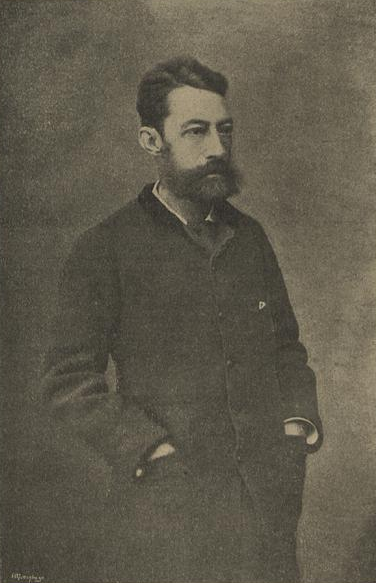
- Born: Francisco Martins de Gouveia de Morais Sarmento; 9 March 1833; Guimarães, Portugal
- Died: 9 August 1899 (aged 66); Guimarães, Portugal
- Occupation: Archaeologist
- Years active: 45
- Known for: Research into the Portuguese Castro culture
- Parent(s): Francisco Joaquim de Gouveia de Morais Sarmento and Joaquina Cândida de Araújo Martins da Costa

Francisco Martins de Gouveia de Morais Sarmento (1833 –1899) was a Portuguese archaeologist, epigrapher, ethnologist, photographer, and writer.

== Early life ==
Sarmento was born in Guimarães, on 9 March 1833. He was the only son of five children of Francisco Joaquim de Gouveia de Morais Sarmento and Joaquina Cândida de Araújo Martins da Costa, who were both well connected and wealthy. After education in Guimarães, he went to the Colégio da Lapa in Porto where, among other subjects, he studied Latin, and then to the Faculty of Law of the University of Coimbra, at the time Portugal's leading university. He graduated at the age of 20 but was, however, never to practice law.

== Career ==
Instead, Sarmento devoted himself to the study of archaeology. Between 1874 and 1879 he carried out a methodical exploration of the Castro culture of the Citânia de Briteiros and the Citânia de Sabroso, both situated near Guimarães, close to where his parents lived. In 1880, he identified the Castro das Eiras, in Pousada de Saramagos, but this was not excavated until 1990. The Castro culture refers to the period in Iberia from the Bronze Age until the Roman invasion around the 1st century BCE. Sarmento financed most of this work himself, often buying the land on which his discoveries were made in order to provide them with some measure of protection. His marriage (at age 43) to Maria de Freitas Aguiar further improved his economic situation. In August 1881, Sarmento participated in the scientific expedition to the Serra da Estrela, organized by the Lisbon Geographical Society, as head of the archaeology section. There, he discovered, among others, the Anta da Pêra do Moço, a megalithic dolmen. Again, it would be a long time before his discovery could be excavated.

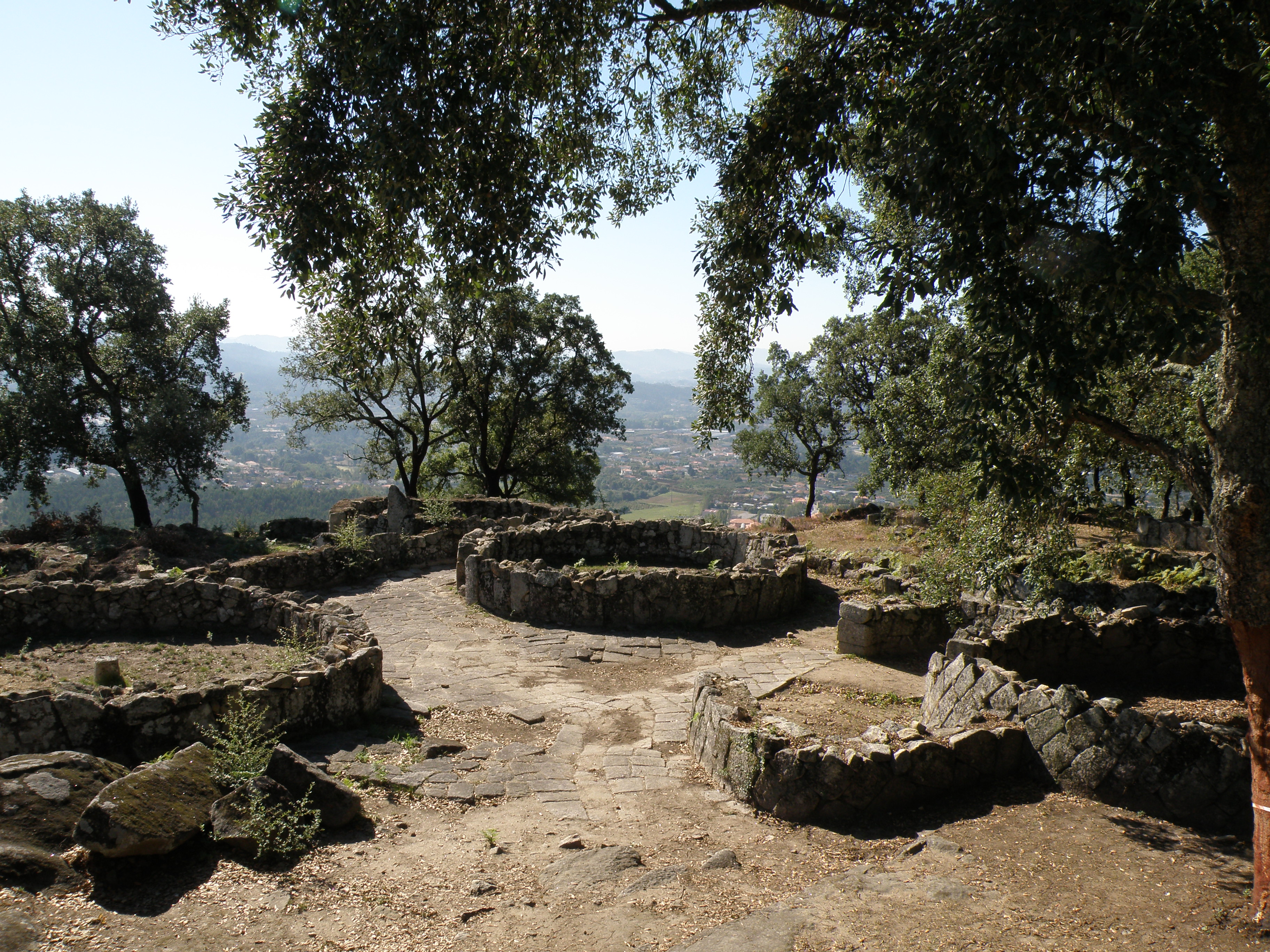
Citânia de Briteiros houses and paving reconstructed by Sarmento

Sarmento was a cultured and self-taught man, who was often at odds with the academics of the time. For example, he was against the widespread belief that there had been a Celtic presence in northern Portugal, and defended the idea of a pre-Celtic origin. He supported this theory based on classical literature and on his excavations, which demonstrated a uniqueness of the Castro culture, in regard to the sites and the artifacts found at them. Arguing against him were two noted professors of linguistics, Francisco Adolfo Coelho and José Leite de Vasconcelos, who also dabbled in archaeology. Both argued that the language of the time had definite Celtic origins.

Sarmento also wrote poetry and contributed to scientific magazines and newspapers, sometimes controversially. His work can be found in the magazines Renascença (1878–1879?) and O Pantheon (1880–1881) and in the weekly Branco e Negro (1896–1898). A photographer from 1868, he was an early adopter of scientific photography in Portugal, particularly in the field of epigraphy, or the study of inscriptions, in which he collaborated with the German classical philologist and epigrapher Emil Hübner. It was also through photography that he disseminated his archaeological discoveries, such as the Citânia de Briteiros.

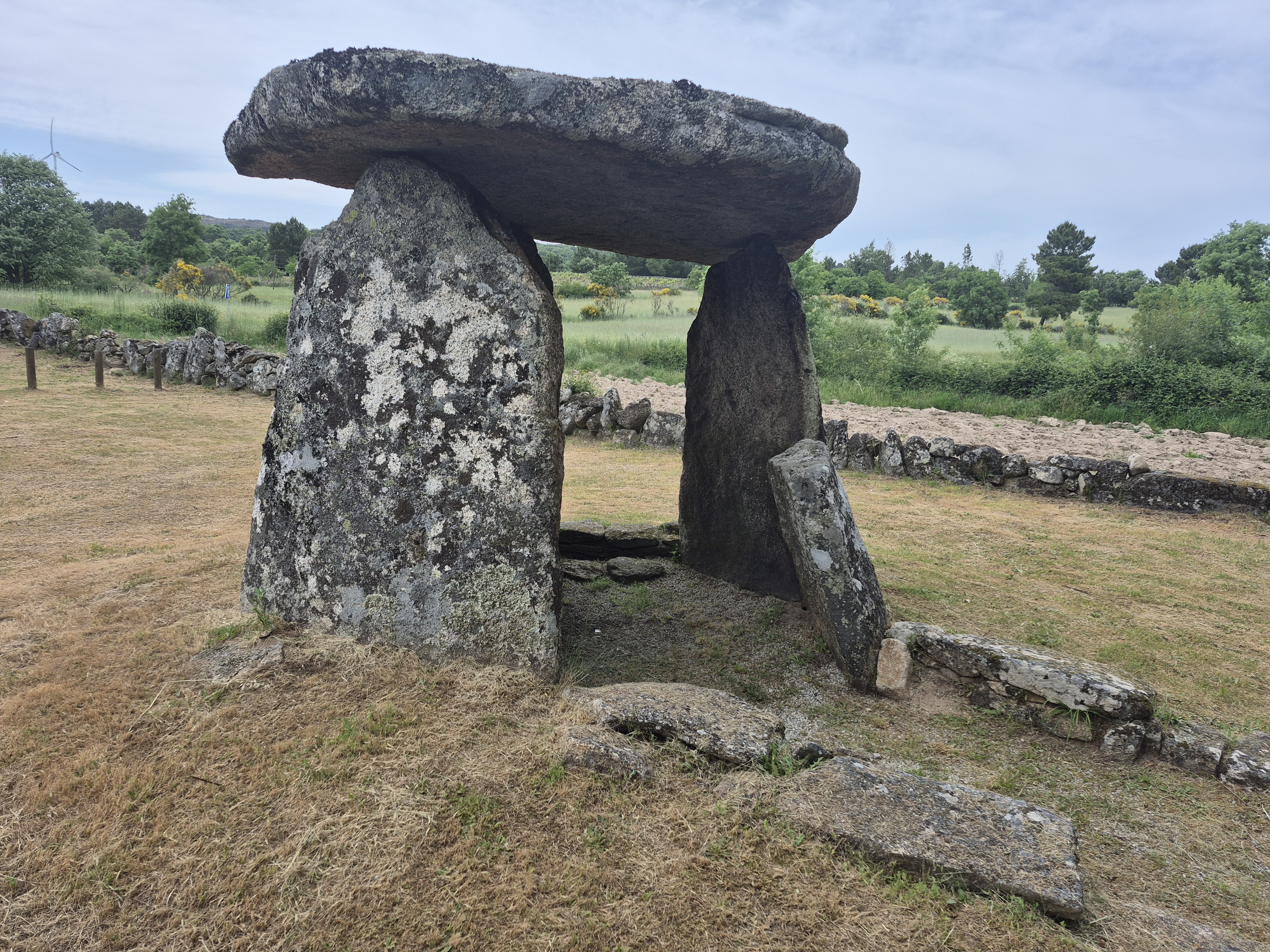
Anta da Pera do Moço discovered by Sarmento

The presentation of his archaeological findings of the Citânia de Briteiros site at the first Portuguese Congress of Archaeology, held in 1877, and at the 9th International Congress of Anthropology and Prehistoric Archaeology, held in Lisbon in 1880, was seen as placing Guimarães on the world map. Many of the congress participants visited Guimarães to see the Citânia de Briteiros. Despite his relative affluence and his knowledge of foreign languages, Sarmento only left Portugal to visit Galicia in northern Spain, never attending international conferences in other countries.

== Martins Sarmento Society ==
The Martins Sarmento Society was founded in 1881 by a group of Guimarães residents who, keen on promoting the importance of education and the dissemination of culture, decided to work together to create an institution in Guimarães that would honour Sarmento and, at the same time, promote popular education. Sarmento was a much-admired figure in the city, both for his ethnological and archaeological work and for his civic and moral qualities.

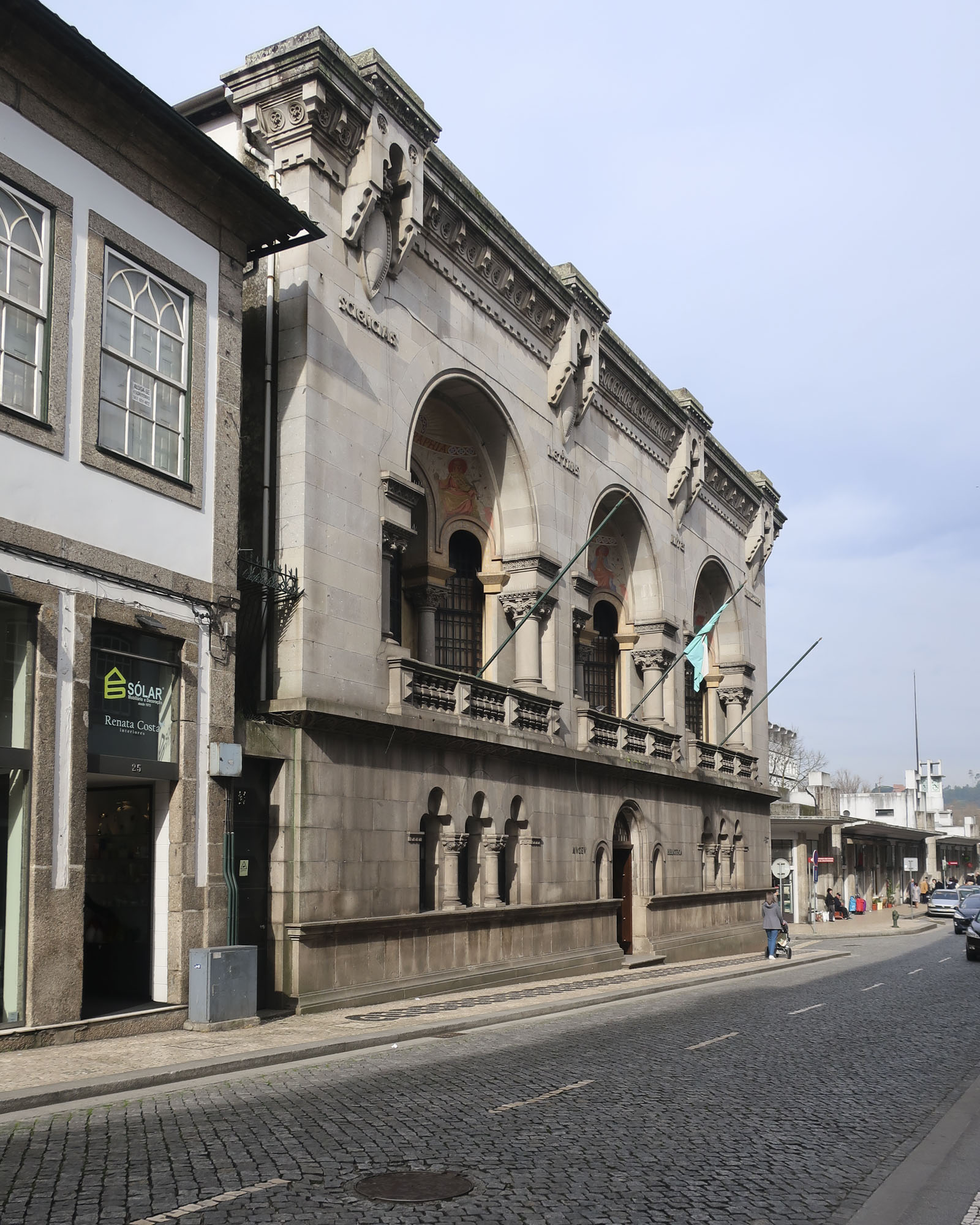
The Martins Sarmento Society Building in Guimarães

In its early years, the society concentrated on popular education, since the city lacked sufficient educational institutions for its population. It promoted the creation of a range of schools teaching job skills, music, and foreign languages, and even providing military instruction. Later, the Society focused more on dissemination of scientific information and on the protection of the municipality's historical and archaeological heritage.

In 1887, the Guimarães Municipal Chamber gave the Sarmento Society what was left of a defunct convent in the centre of the city. From 1890, work was carried out to adapt the buildings to the Society's requirements. In 1899 a new façade was designed and the work, completed in 1908, forms the basis of the present-day Martins Sarmento Society Building. This contains the Martins Sarmento Society Museum, which holds a large part of Sarmento's archaeological findings and also his photographs.

== Death and legacy ==
Sarmento died on 9 August 1899. The Martins Sarmento Society, Museum and Building provide an enduring legacy. A secondary school in Guimarães was named after him in 1891, as well as a training centre. In 1933, the Lisbon City Council named a street after him. Interestingly, Sarmento was apparently invited to become a member of the Military Order of Saint James of the Sword, but declined the honour.
