= Anta da Pêra do Moço =

Prehistoric dolmen in Guarda District, Portugal

- Anta do Carvalhal de Gouveias
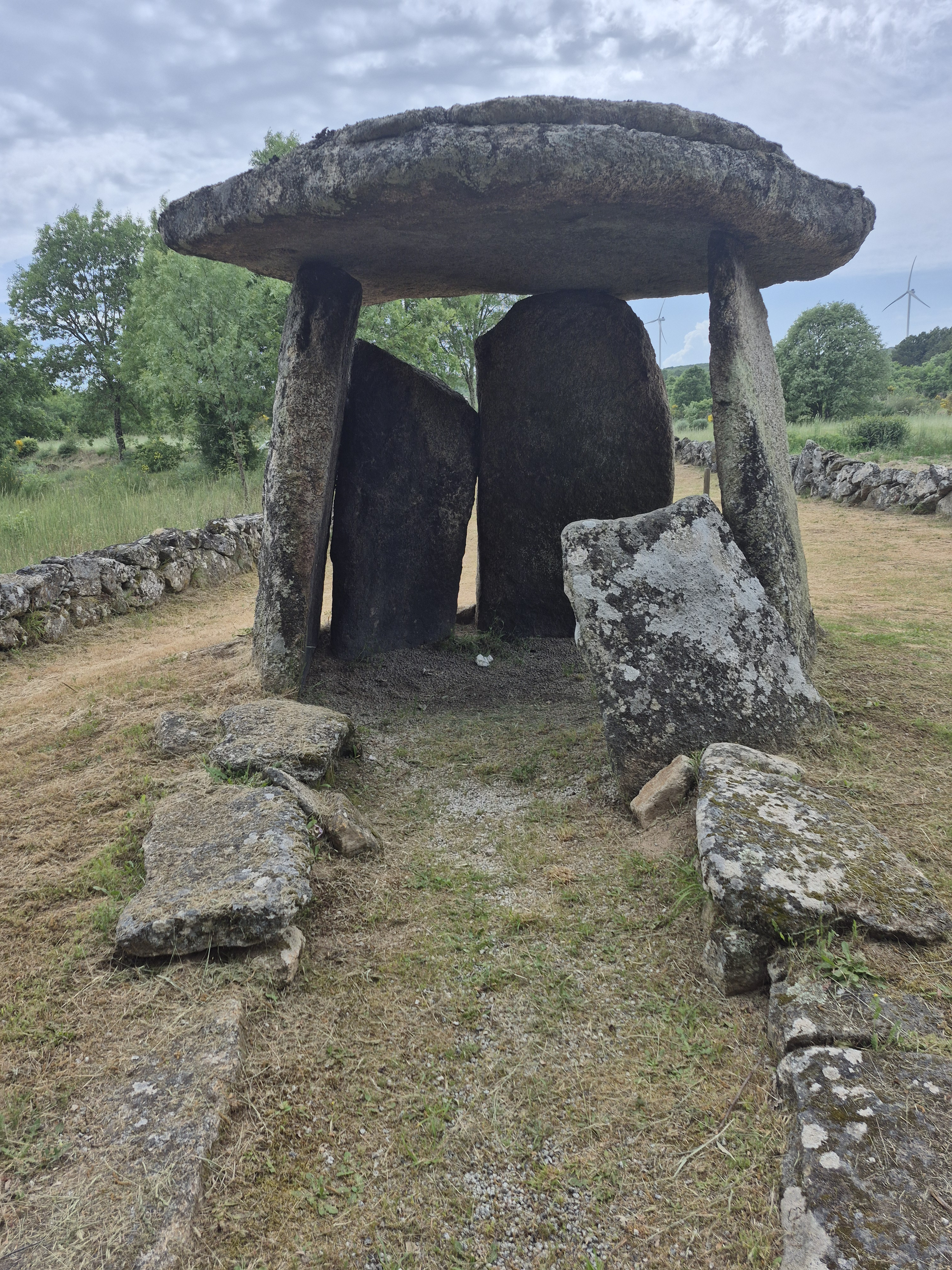
- Interactive map of Anta da Pêra do Moço
- 40°37′34.7″N 7°11′51″W
- Type: Dolmen
- Periods: Early Chalcolithic
- Location: Pêra do Moço, Guarda District, Portugal

Site notes
- Material: Granite
- Height: 2 m (6.6 ft)
- Excavation dates: 1881; 2001–
- Condition: Good.
- Owner: Pêra do Moço parish
- Public access: Yes

The Anta da Pêra do Moço (previously known as the Anta do Carvalhal de Gouveias) is a Neo-Chalcolithic dolmen, or burial chamber, located in the parish of Pêra do Moço in the Guarda District of Portugal.

== Description ==
Anta is the Portuguese term for approximately 5,000 megalithic monuments or dolmens erected during the Neolithic or early Chalcolitihic periods in western Iberia. The Anta da Pêra do Moço is a polygonal chamber made up of five trapezoidal granite orthostats, or upright stones, which are inclined towards the centre. It is covered by an oval-shaped capstone, which is approximately 2.5 metres in diameter and rests on three of the upright stones, which have an average height of 2 metres. Unlike many other dolmens in Iberia, no traces of a burial mound have been discovered. Close to a highway, with parking space provided, it is one of the more accessible dolmens in Portugal. The area is separated by a dry-stone wall from agricultural land and, as of 2026, was well maintained.

== Excavations ==
The archaeologist, Martins Sarmento, visited the dolmen in 1881 and gave it the name of the Anta do Carvalhal de Gouveias. He noted that it was in the middle of a field and at that time served both as a kitchen and as a shelter for youth who herded cattle. He considered that it was "tolerably well preserved". Sarmento reported that it had seven orthostats, suggesting that two smaller ones have since been removed. He could find no evidence of a corridor leading to the chamber, but subsequent excavations have exposed one. In 1892, the dolmen and one metre of land around it was purchased by a group of friends, who later donated it to the Martins Sarmento Society. In 1989, the surrounding land was purchased by the parish of Pêra do Moço. Since then, the area around the monument has been upgraded, and archaeological studies have been carried out under the supervision of Pedro Sobral de Carvalho.

== Categorization ==
The dolmen is categorized as a Property of Public Interest, under Decree No. 39 175, DG, 1st series, No. 77 of 17 April 1953.
