= Natasha Batalha =

American astronomer

- Education: Cornell University (B.A., 2013); Pennsylvania State University (Ph.D., 2017)
- Known for: Characterization of exoplanets and target selection for the James Webb Space Telescope; Open-source atmospheric modeling software (Chimera, Picasso)
- Parent: Natalie Batalha (mother)
- Awards: Ames Early Career Researcher Award (2021); Presidential Early Career Award for Scientists and Engineers (2025)

Natasha Elaine Batalha is a Brazilian and American astronomer at NASA's Ames Research Center in Santa Clara County, California. Her research involves the observation of exoplanets to determine the chemical composition of their atmospheres, and the use of these observations to classify exoplanets. She is also known for providing open source code to analyze exoplanet data from the James Webb Space Telescope and to predict the information that can be obtained from proposed observations.Natasha is also an affiliate scientist with the STEI Institue, serving as a co-investigator and Detect task lead for the Virtual Planetary Laboratory Team (VPL Team).

== Education and career ==
Batalha was born in Rio de Janeiro, Brazil, to Brazilian and American parents, and moved several times between Brazil and California as a child. As an undergraduate at Cornell University, Batalha focused her studies on astrobiology, but became more interested in the astronomy of exoplanets through an internship with that focus. She completed her undergraduate studies with a research project using simulated exoplanet data to predict the ability of projected instruments to characterize exoplanets, supervised by Jonathan Lunine. She graduated from Cornell University in 2013 with a bachelor's degree in physics, and continued for a Ph.D. dually in astronomy and astrophysics/astrobiology at the Pennsylvania State University in 2017. Her dissertation, A synergistic approach to interpreting planetary atmospheres, was jointly supervised by Steinn Sigurdsson and James Kasting.

After postdoctoral research at the Space Telescope Science Institute and the University of California, Santa Cruz, she joined the NASA Ames Research Center in 2019. Becoming a NASA Civil Servant, she studies the atmosphere of other planets in regard to their chemistry and physical climate. Batalha also uses observations from the James Webb Space Telescope to study the atmospheres of exoplanets

== Recognition ==
In 2021, Batalha received the Ames Early Career Researcher Award from NASA's Ames Research Center in recognition of her exceptional potential for leadership and her contributions to modeling the climates and chemical compositions of exoplanet atmospheres.

Batalha is a 2025 recipient of the Presidential Early Career Award for Scientists and Engineers, "for transformational scientific research in the development of open-source systems for the modeling of exoplanet atmospheres and observations".

== Personal life ==
Batalha is the daughter of astronomer Natalie Batalha. The two scientists have collaborated on exoplanet research. In 2023, both mother and daughter contributed to observations of hot Saturn-mass exoplanet WASP-39b, as part of James Webb Space Telescope's Early Release Science Program, which resulted in a series of papers published in Nature Journal.Her father, Celso Batalha, is originally from Brazil; he works as a professor of physics and astronomy at Evergreen Valley College, a community college in San Jose, California. Batalha has also taught courses there on computer programming in a program for low-income students founded by her father. She identifies herself as Latinx.
