= Martins Sarmento Society Building =

Museum and headquarters of the Martins Sarmento Society

- Edifício da Sociedade Martins Sarmento
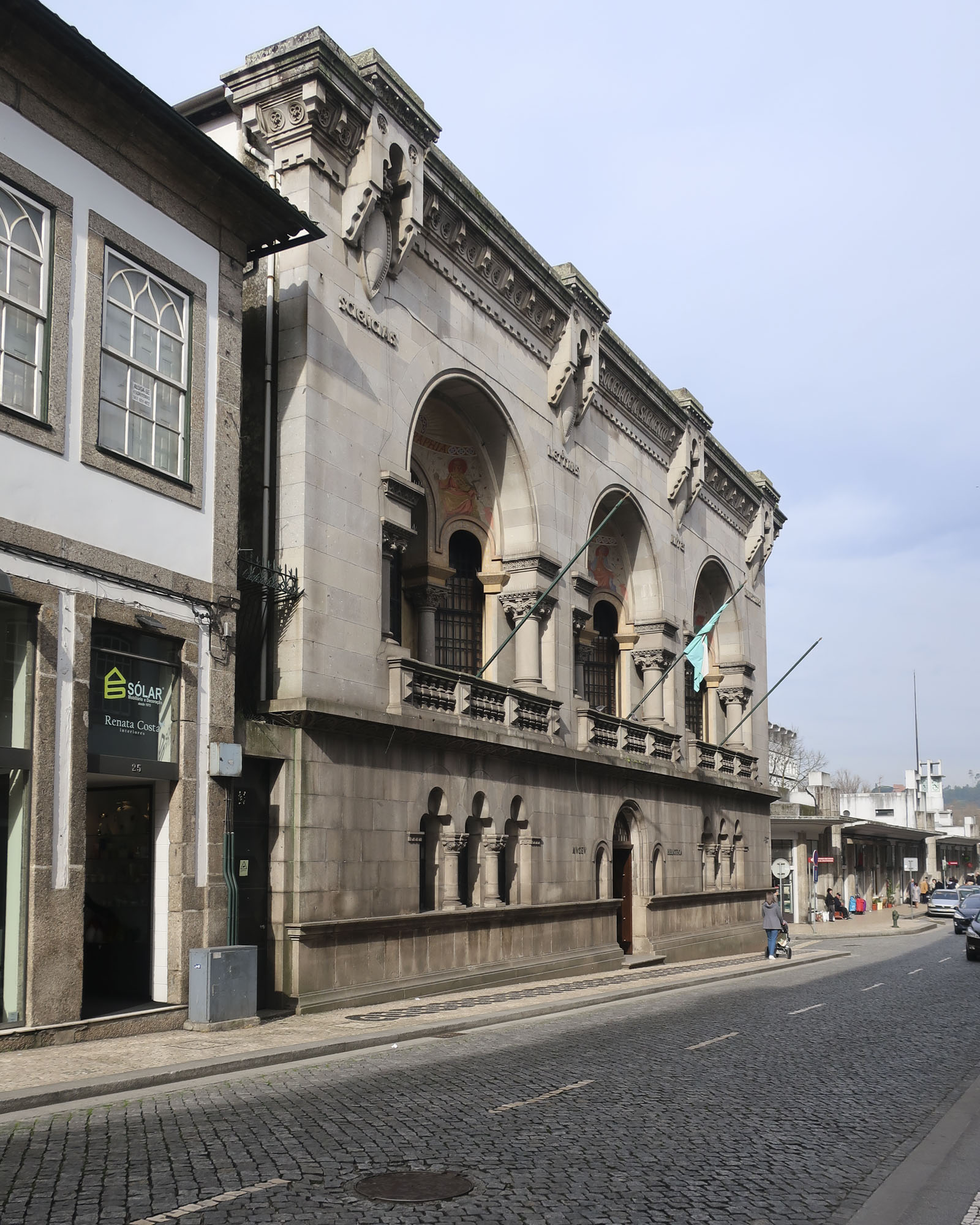
- Martins Sarmento Society Building in February 2019
- Alternative names: Museu Martins Sarmento (Martins Sarmento Museum); O Sarcófago (The Sarcophagus)

General information
- Status: Included in the GHC
- Type: Museum, library, archive
- Architectural style: Neo-Byzantine, Brutalist, Gothic
- Classification: Protected landmark
- Location: Guimarães, Portugal
- Coordinates: 41°26′34″N 8°17′48″W
- Named for: Martins Sarmento
- Years built: 1st phase: 1901–1908; 2nd phase: 1934–1967
- Groundbreaking: 25 May 1901
- Construction started: 1st phase: 1901; 2nd phase: 1934, 1957
- Construction stopped: 1943 (2nd phase)
- Completed: 1st phase: 1908; 2nd phase: June 1967
- Opened: 9 March 1907
- Inaugurated: 1st phase: 9 March 1907; 2nd phase: 17 June 1967
- Owner: Martins Sarmento Society
- Governing body: Martins Sarmento Society

Technical details
- Material: Granite, others
- Floor count: 2

Design and construction
- Architect: José Marques da Silva

The Martins Sarmento Society Building (Portuguese: Edifício da Sociedade Martins Sarmento) is located inside the Historic Centre of Guimarães. It serves both as the headquarters of the Martins Sarmento Society, established in honour of the archaeologist Martins Sarmento, and as a museum. The building was designed by the Portuguese architect José Marques da Silva and was constructed in two distinct phases: the first (1901–1908) follows the Neo-Byzantine style, while the second (1934–1967) follows the Brutalist style and it served to connect the previous with the 14th century Convent of São Domingos.

== Description ==
Built in granite masonry, the building has two floors on the main façade facing the street, with the central portal and flanking openings with round arches. On the main floor, three large semicircular arches, the central one opening onto the entrance portico, are supported by cylindrical columns and capitals decorated with molded imposts containing large niches preceded by balustrades. Each of them has three raised arches, the central one being the highest, and all feature polychrome paintings by Abel Cardoso. Above the main floor runs a complex and thick entablature with corbels next to the cornice, interrupted by four lanceolate medallions between the corbels that hide the gargoyles of the cornice. Under the medallions, and carved in relief in the granite, are the inscriptions: "Sciencias" (Sciences), "Lettras" (Literatures), "Artes" (Arts) and "Indvstrias" (Industries).

This decorative scheme on the frontispiece is repeated on the north side façade, with the exception of the gate, which does not exist there, and on the main floor, where the arcades do not feature paintings. The west wing of the building, which was built later, has an almost completely bare decorative style, reminiscent of the main façade only in the dentil corbels that support the eaves and the cornice separating the two floors, which are divided by straight openings, an extension of the existing one in the neo-Romantic wing, which, according to José-Augusto França, never "had a more coherent application in Portugal, at the secular level...".

== History ==
=== Background ===
After its creation in 1881 and throughout the early years of its existence, the Martins Sarmento Society (MSS) struggled to find a permanent place to settle in. Its libraries, and the Archaeology and Numismatics museum, as well as the activities it carried out (primary classes, the secondary education institute, evening courses, and embroidery classes) were housed in various spaces around the city, including Martins Sarmento's mansion at the Carmo Square.

On 4 January 1887, the Guimarães City Council approved the temporary transfer of the remains of the former Convent of São Domingos, together with an adjoining building, to the MSS for the establishment of a museum and a library. The following year, a decree was issued granting the MSS permanent possession of the building and its annexes, and from 1890 onwards, a series of interventions were made to adapt the complex to the Society's needs and projects.

The origins of the current Martins Sarmento Society Building date back to 1896, when, at a meeting of the society's Board of Directors, it was decided to proceed with a project to build a new façade for their old-fashioned headquarters. In 1899, the architect José Marques da Silva was commissioned to design this new space in August, just a few months before Martins Sarmento's death.

=== First phase (1901–1908) ===
As a result of the decision taken in 1890 by the Construction Committee, chaired by Martins Sarmento, to erect a new façade, the first phase of the project was approved in 1900 and commenced on 25 May 1901 and continued until 1908. This phase aimed to provide the headquarters with a new façade and an additional wing, replacing the deteriorated existing structure and extending the building towards the street by removing the small forecourt that stood in front of it. The main façade was completed on 15 February 1905 and the main hall was inaugurated on 9 March 1907, despite works continuing until the following year. The frescos on this façade were made and completed by painter Abel Cardoso.

=== Second phase (1934–1967) ===
In 1934, Marques da Silva was asked for a new project to extend the new façade and connect it to the old gothic Convent of S. Domingos which had already begun receiving interventions four years earlier, including plasterwork and flooring repairs, in order to incorporate it in the building complex. The project involved replacing the old central headquarters with a new modern structure, integrating the different parts of the complex into a unified building. Construction began at the end of that same year, with the project still in progress.

The complete project was delivered in 1936 and was used by the Martins Sarmento Society to ask the Portuguese state to contribute to the construction; it received a small grant in 1937, but in 1938 it was decided that the state would no longer contribute to the work. The work continued until it was interrupted in 1943.

After the death of Marques da Silva in 1947, the execution of this new phase was continued by Silva's daughter and his son-in-law, who continued all the projects that were underway.

The work undertaken after 1947 extended beyond mere supervision of the construction process and included the preparation of numerous execution drawings (such as construction details, furniture designs and lighting schemes), which completed and refined the original 1936 project. The stonework guard for the floor of the Grand Staircase came from a side project presented later in 1953: "treatment of the flooring and wainscoting with sawn granite around the staircase, the profile of the wooden doors, the furniture in the Reading Room and the metal lantern in the box of the Grand Staircase".

The final phase of the project began with the launch of a tender in 1957, leading to the completion of the building in 1967. The inauguration took place on 17 June 1967 and was attended by the President of the Republic, Admiral Américo Tomás.

== Gallery ==
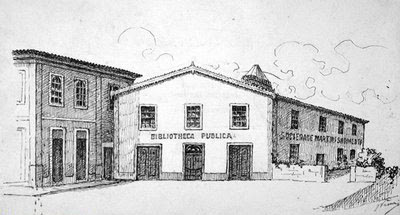
The old building granted by the city council to be the Martins Sarmento Society's (MSS) new headquarters

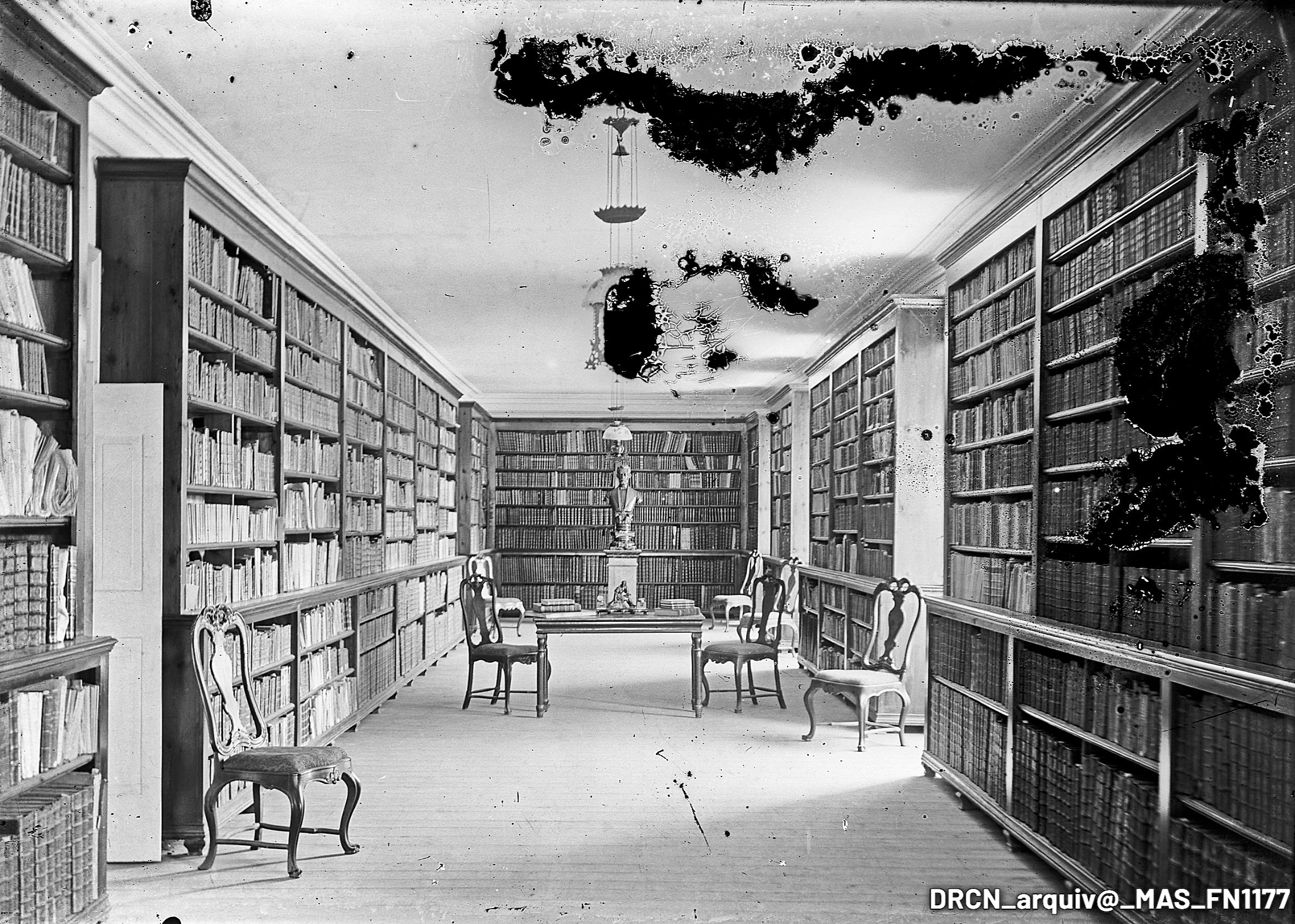
Photograph of the library of the old building, late 1800s or early 1900s

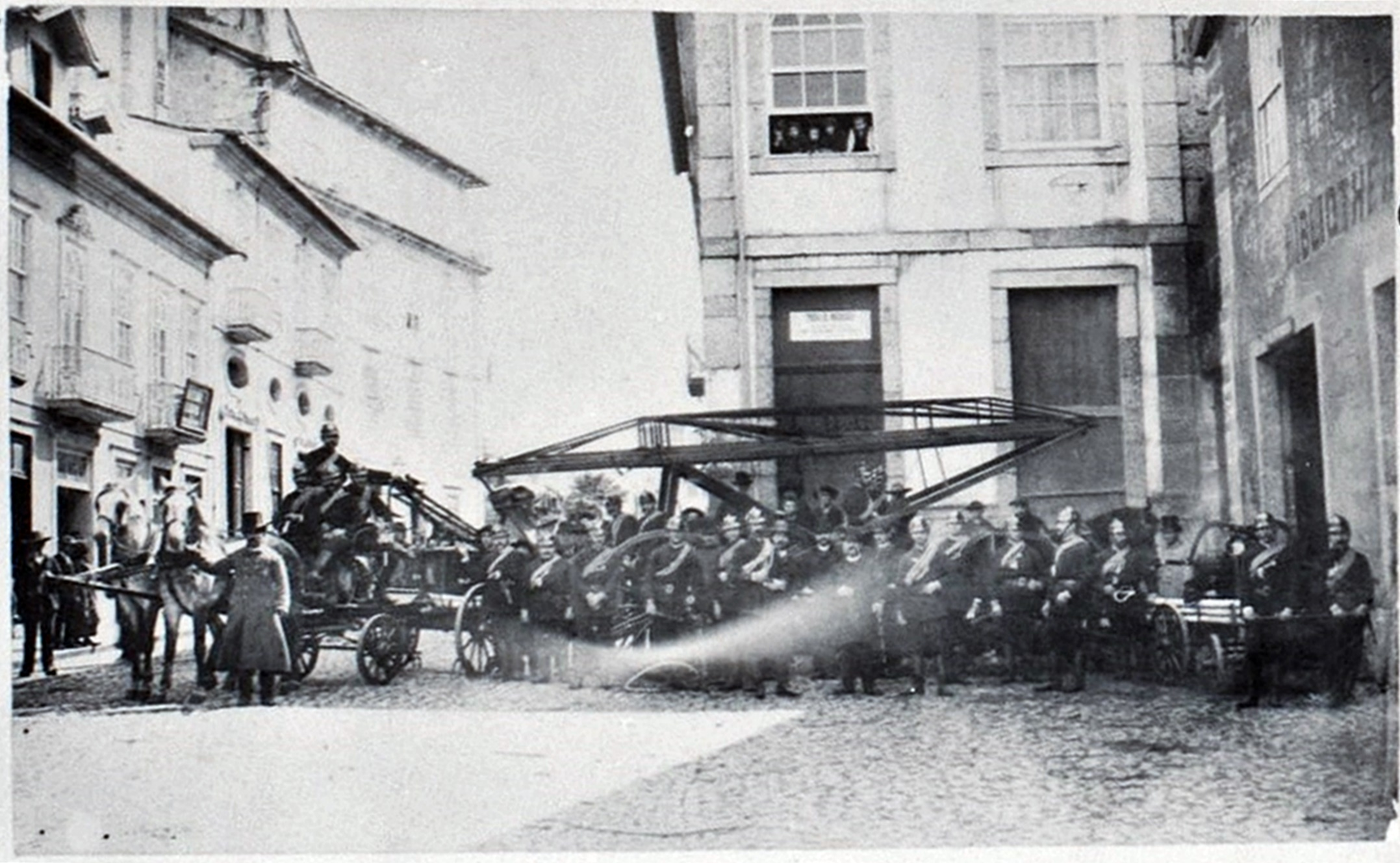
Firefighters posing next to the MSS headquarters (right), in the area where its new façade would soon be built, circa 1900

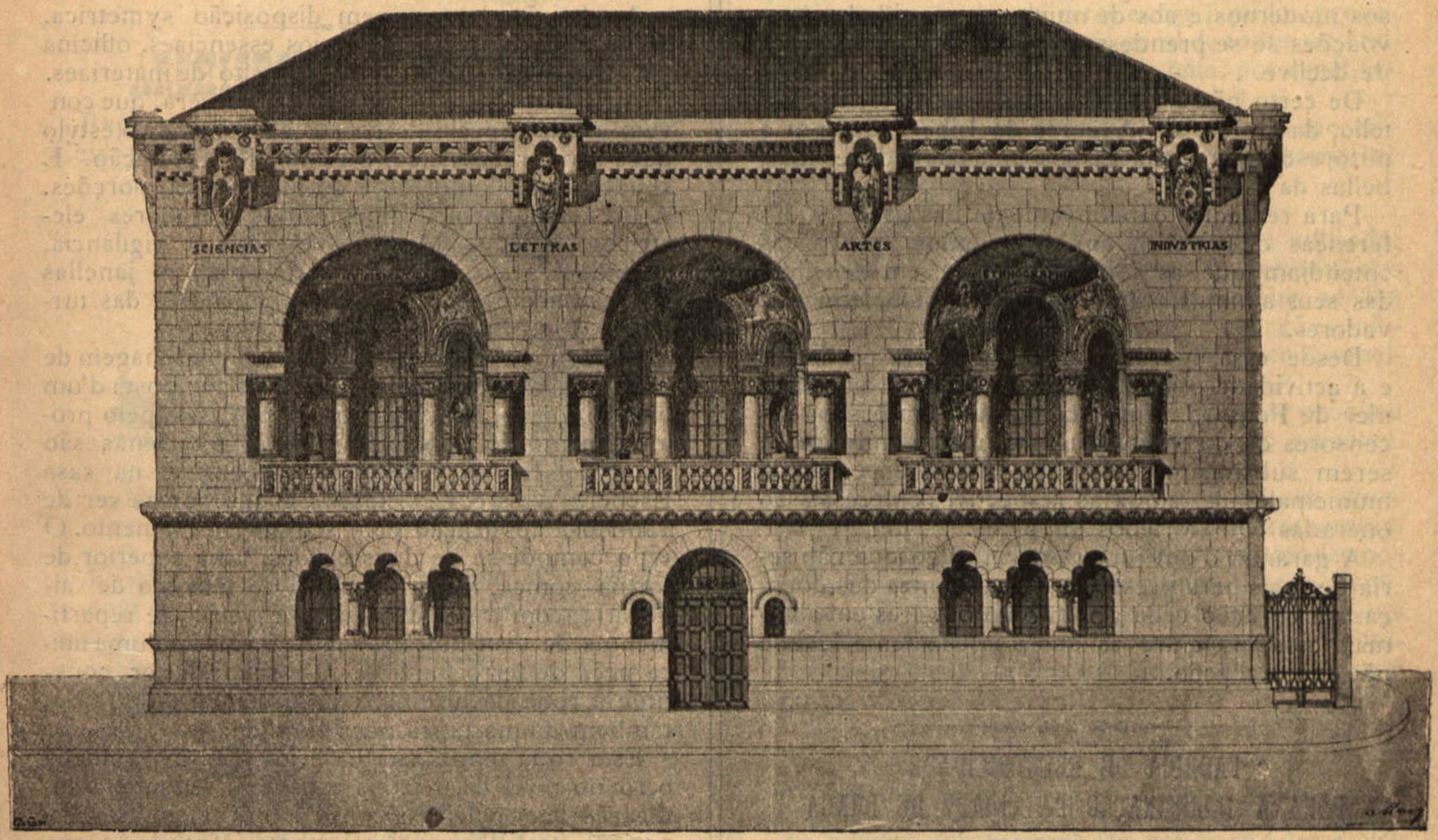
Project of the new façade by architect Marques da Silva

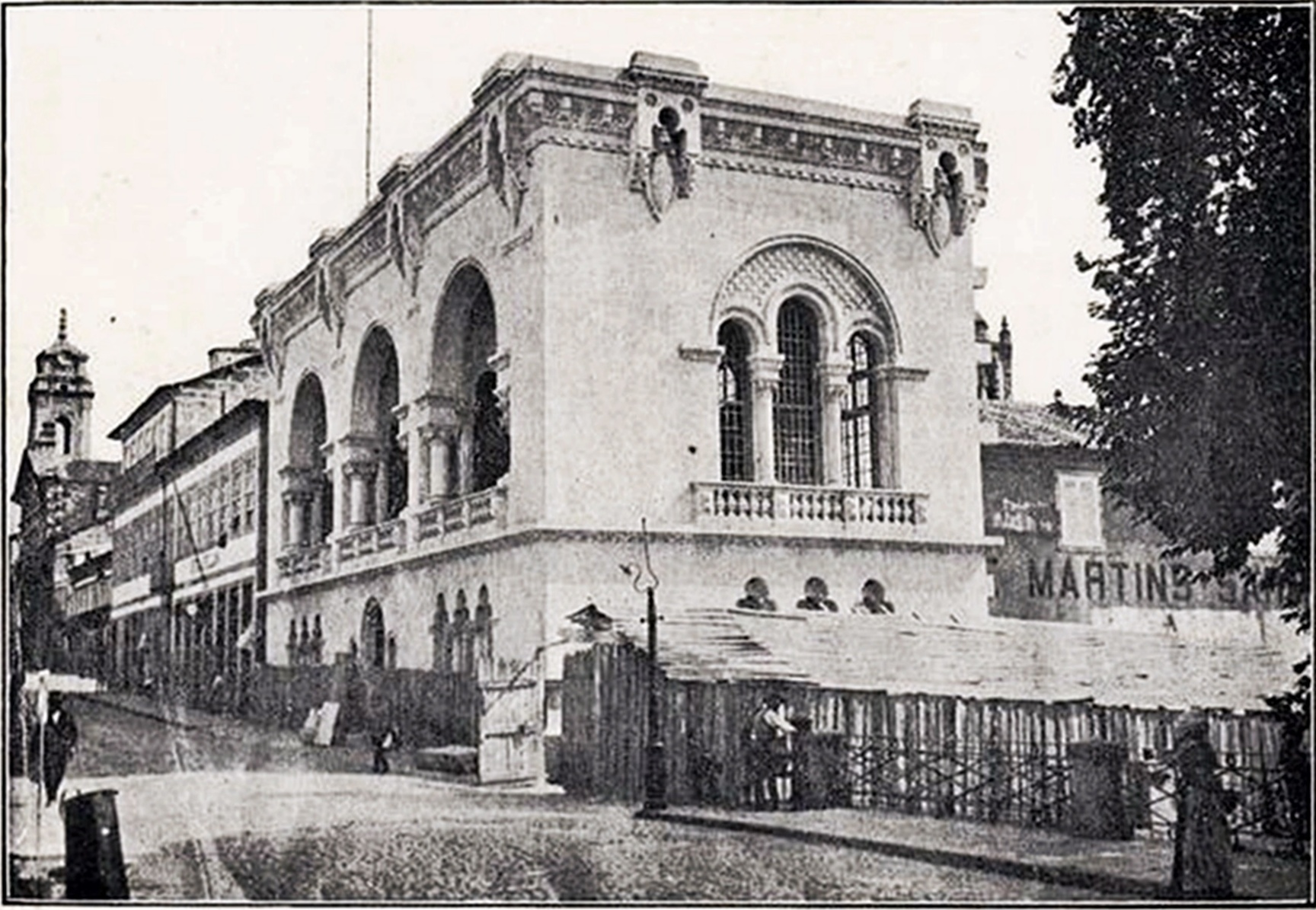
Final stages of the construction of the new façade, circa 1905

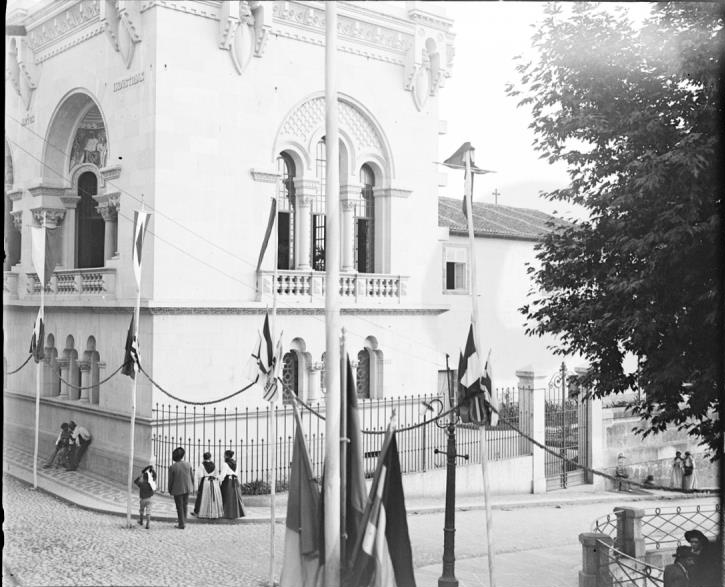
The building following the conclusion of the 1st phase, 1908

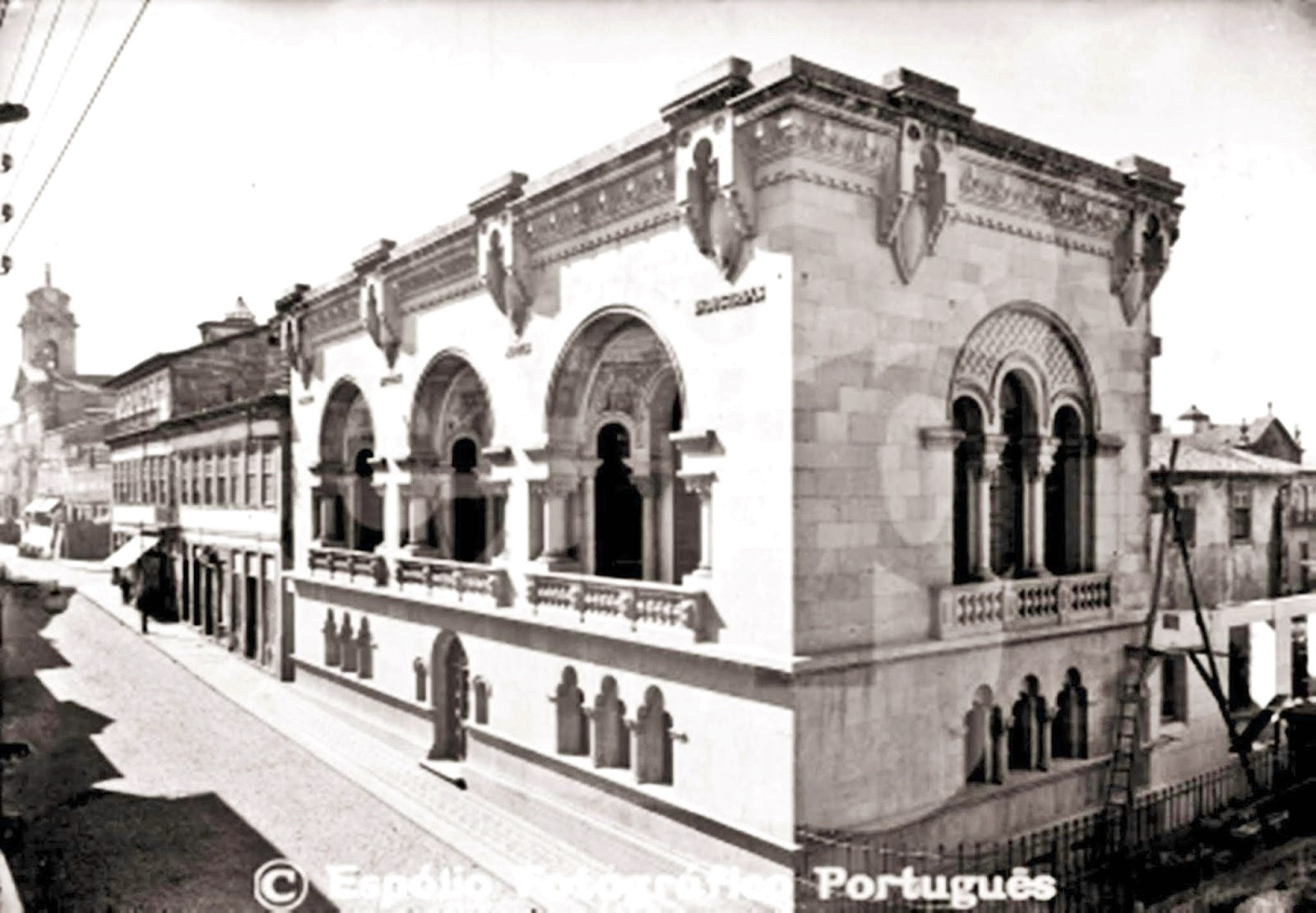
Early stages of the 2nd phase (right), where the new structure was built around the old building before its demolition, 1938

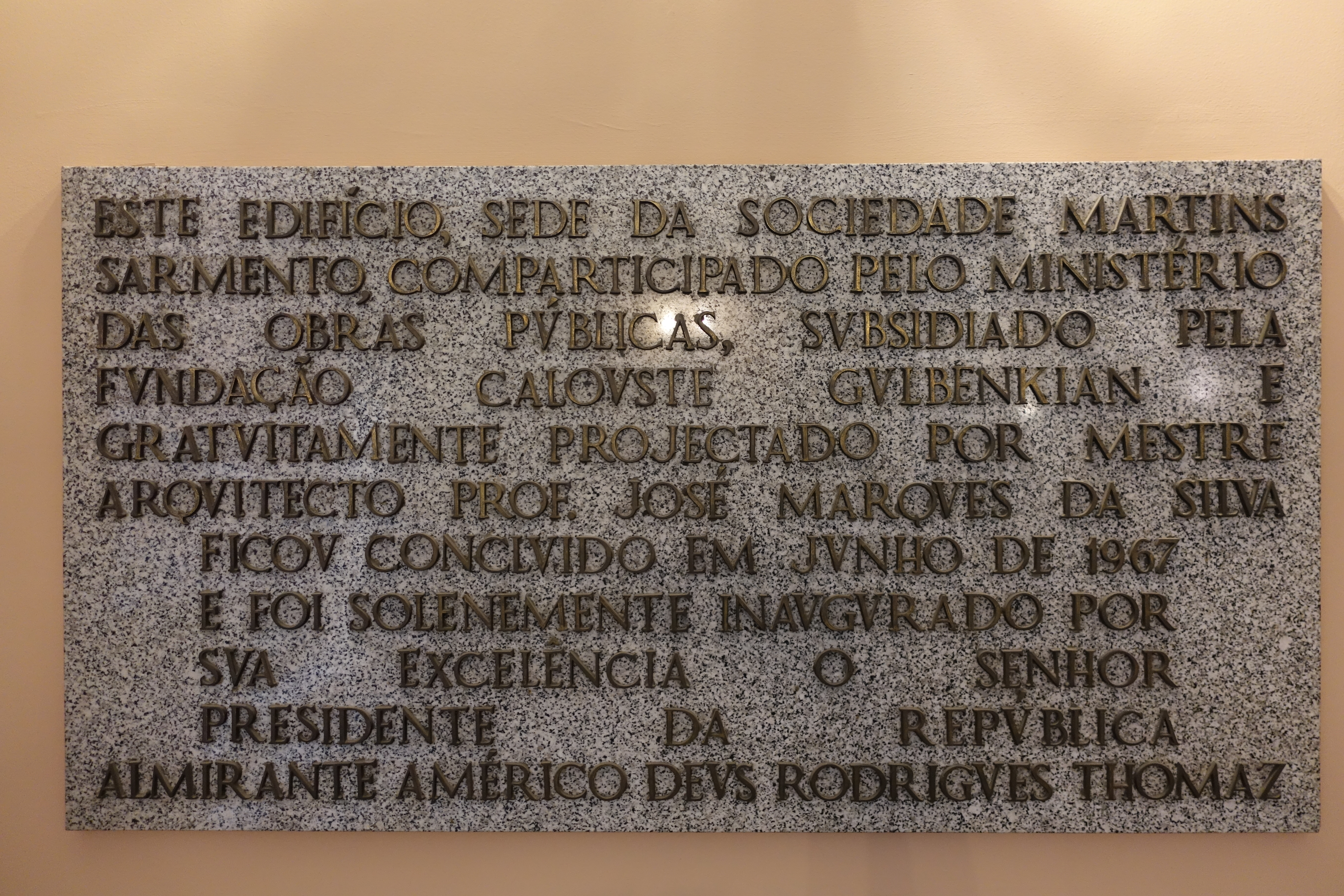
Stone slab stating the inauguration of the building in 1967 by President Américo Tomás

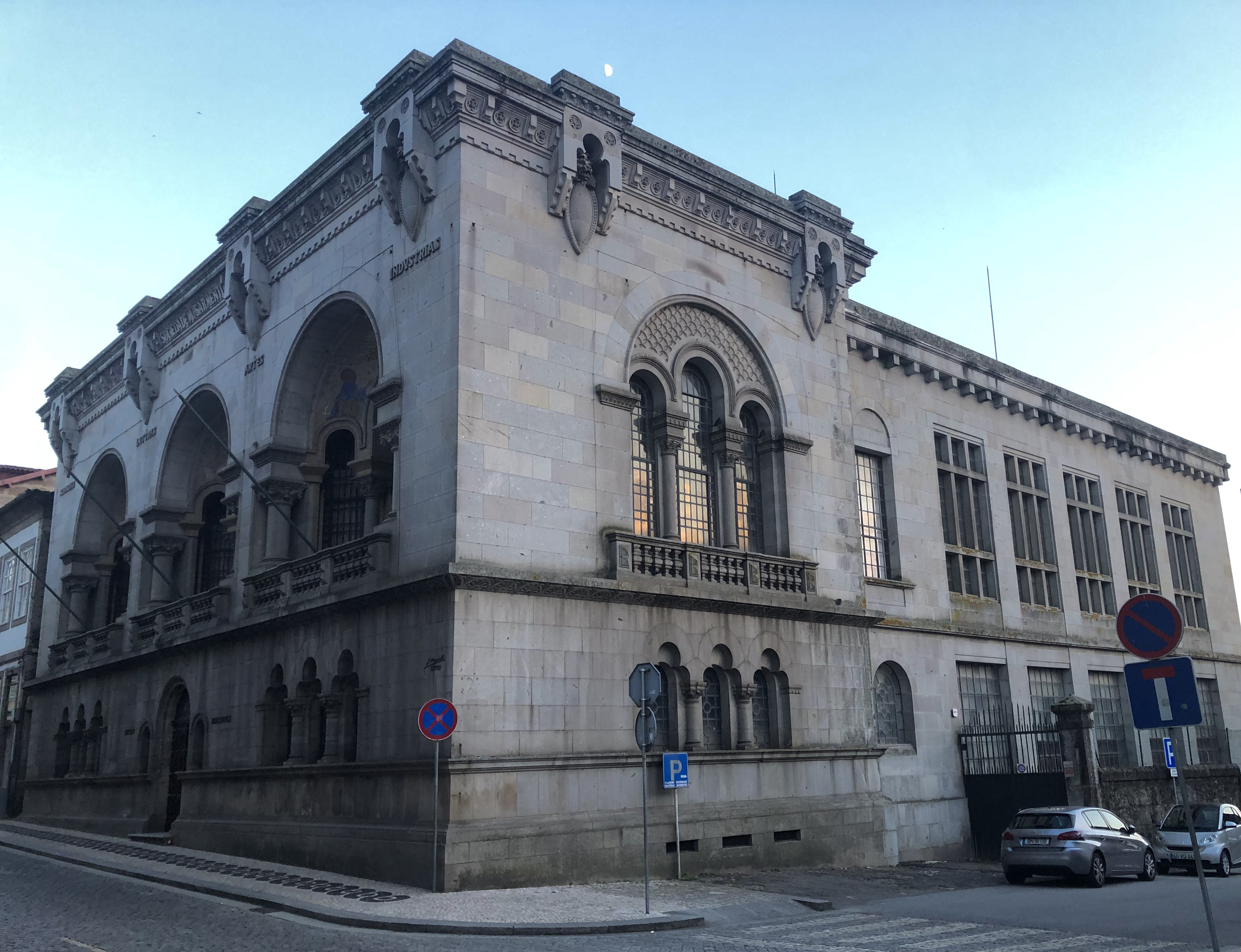
The MSS building fully completed, 2025

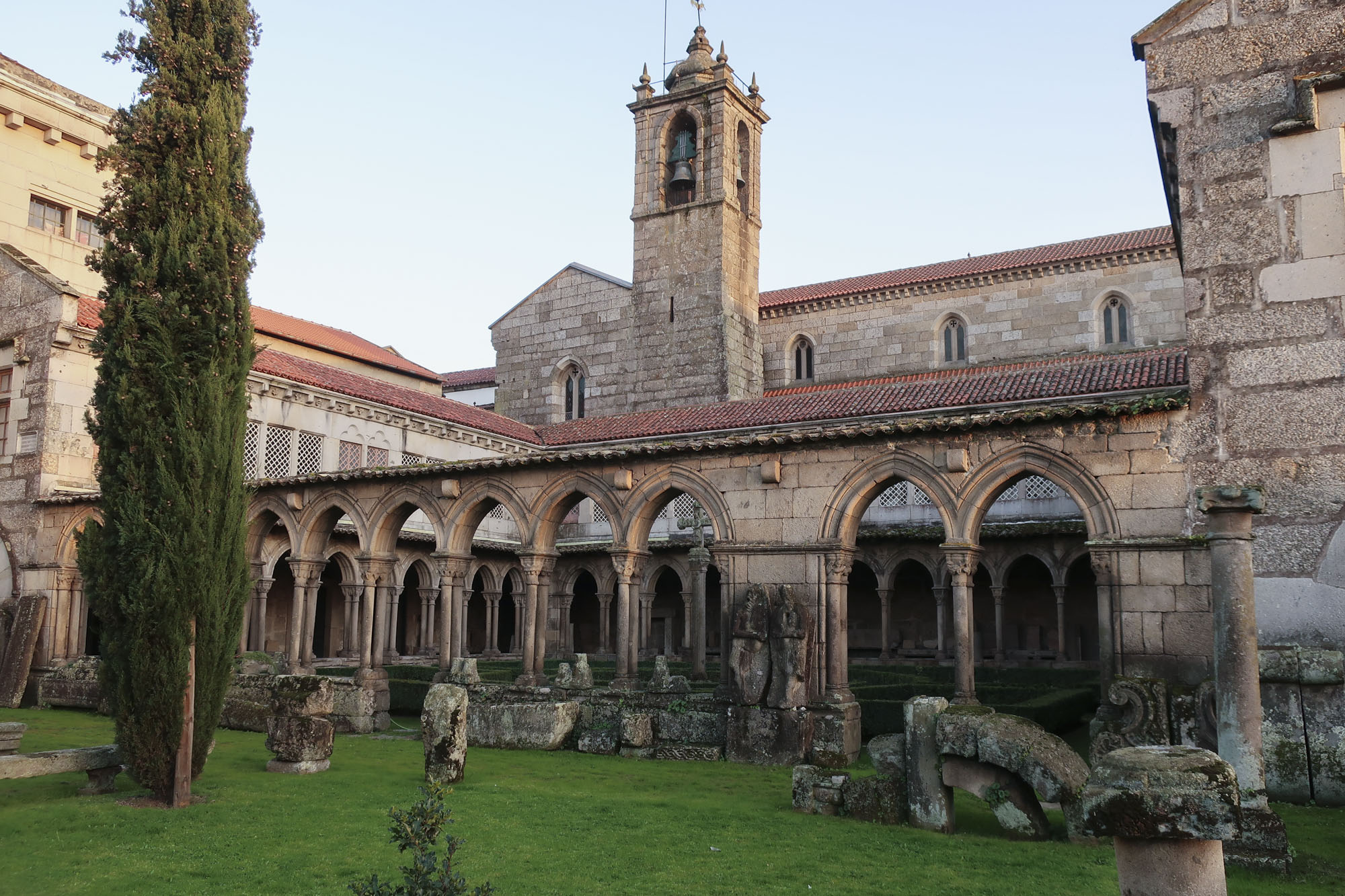
Back of the building, the cloister of S. Domingos, 2019

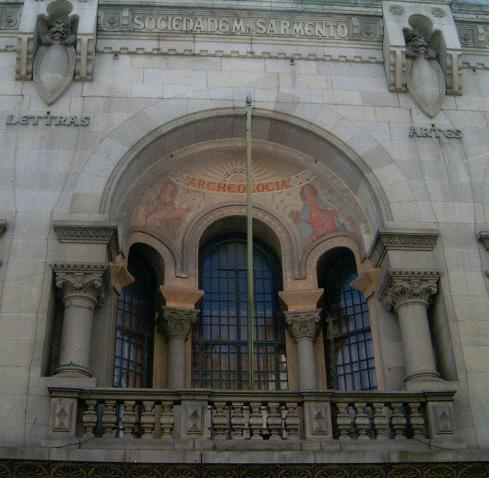
Byzantine style window of the front façade with frescos painted by Abel Cardoso

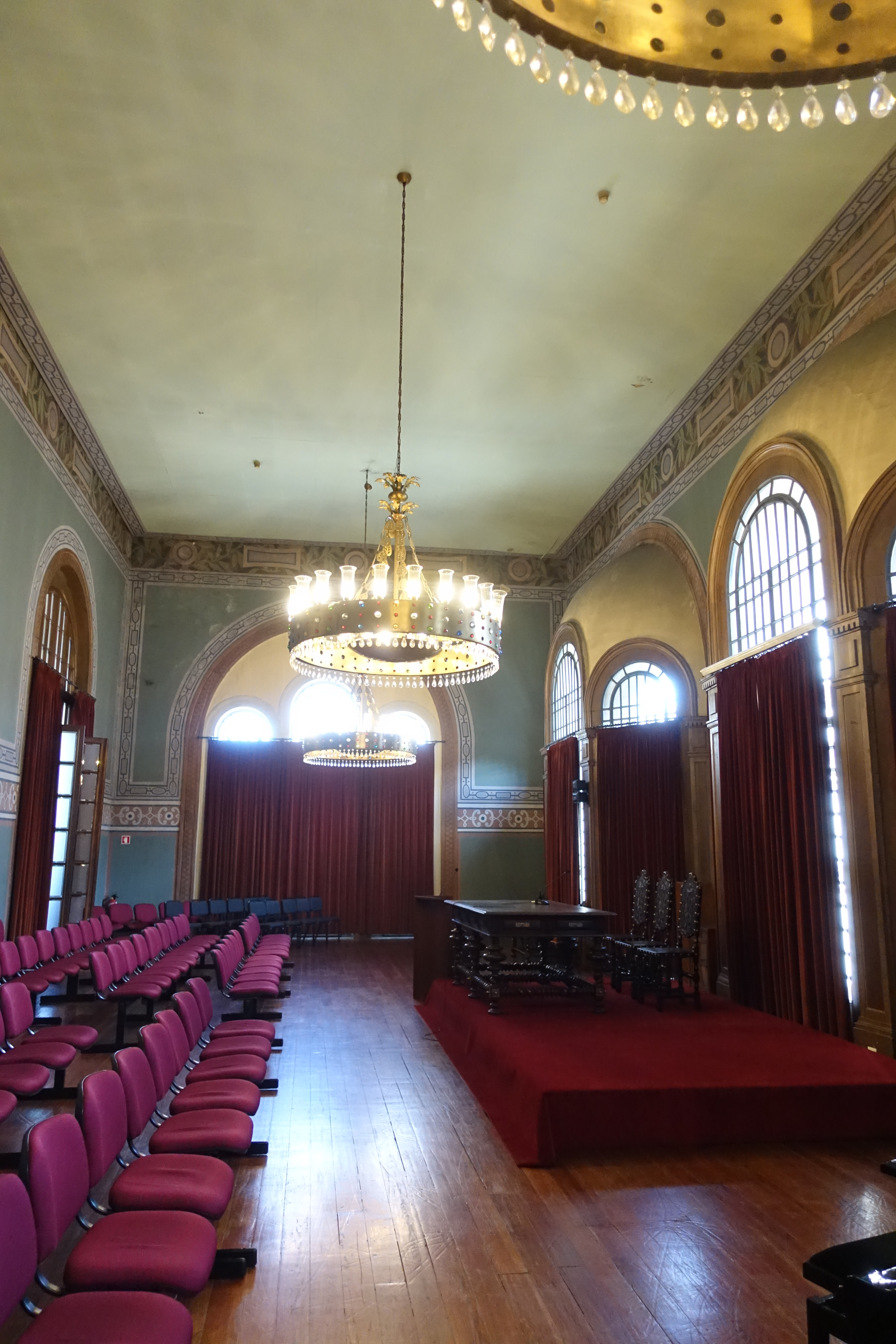
Grand hall and interior, 2019

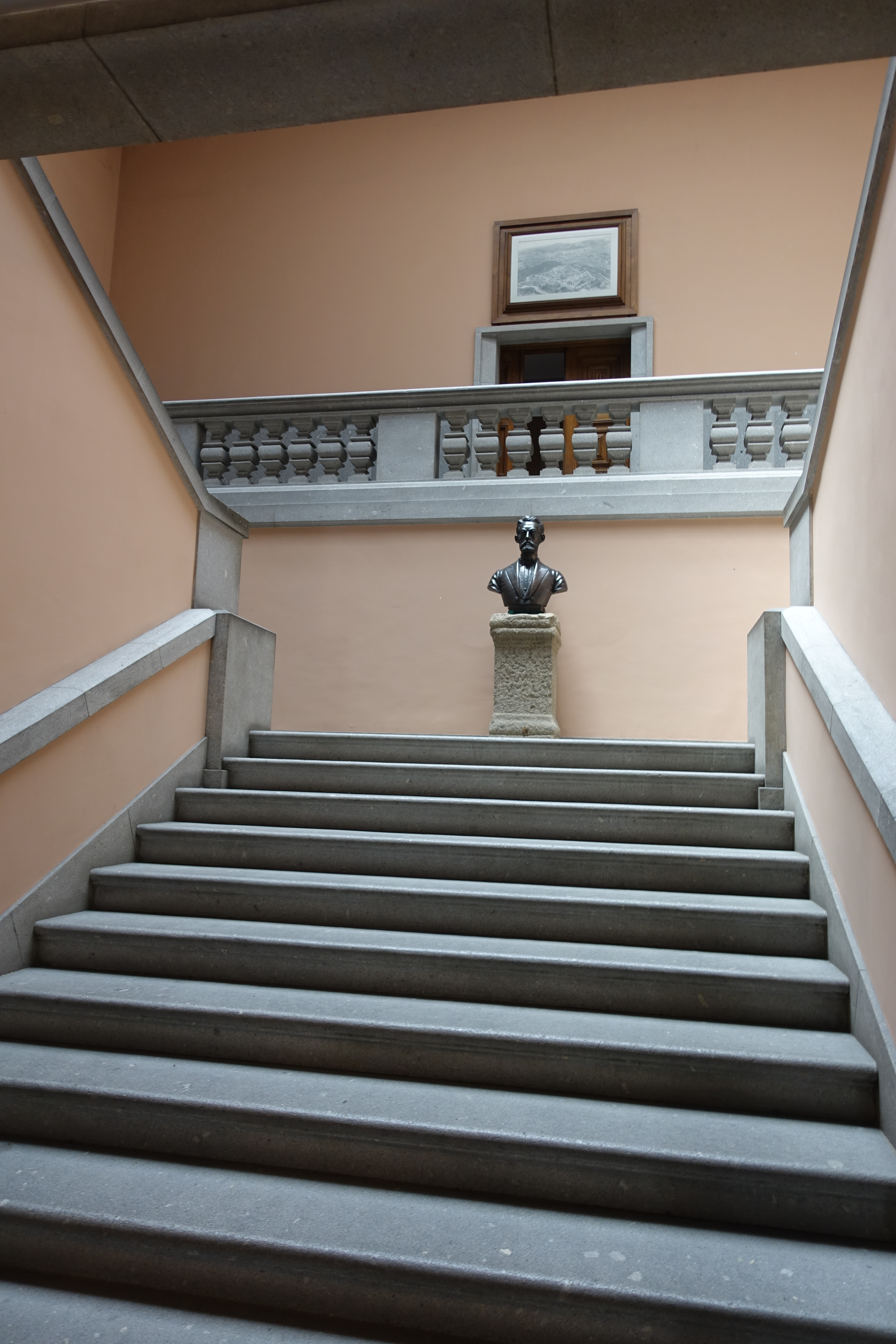
Grand staircase connecting both phases of the building in the Suave style, 2019

== See also ==
- Martins Sarmento
- Martins Sarmento Society
- Marques da Silva
- List of buildings and structures in Guimarães
