= Batalla =

Batalla is a Spanish word, meaning "battle". It is also used as a surname (that originated in Spain as well). Notable people with the surname include:

- Francesc Badia i Batalla (1923–2020), Andorran public servant
- Hugo Batalla (1926–1998), Uruguayan politician, Vice President 1995–98
- Pablo Batalla (born 1984), Turkish football player
- Perla Batalla, Mexican-American singer-songwriter
- Rick Batalla (born 1962), actor and playwright

== Other ==
- Battaglia (music), musical depictions of battle cultivated in Spain chiefly as a keyboard genre by organist-composers.

== See also ==
- Un Paso Mas En La Batalla, studio album by V8
