= Natalie Batalha =

American astrophysicist (born 1966)

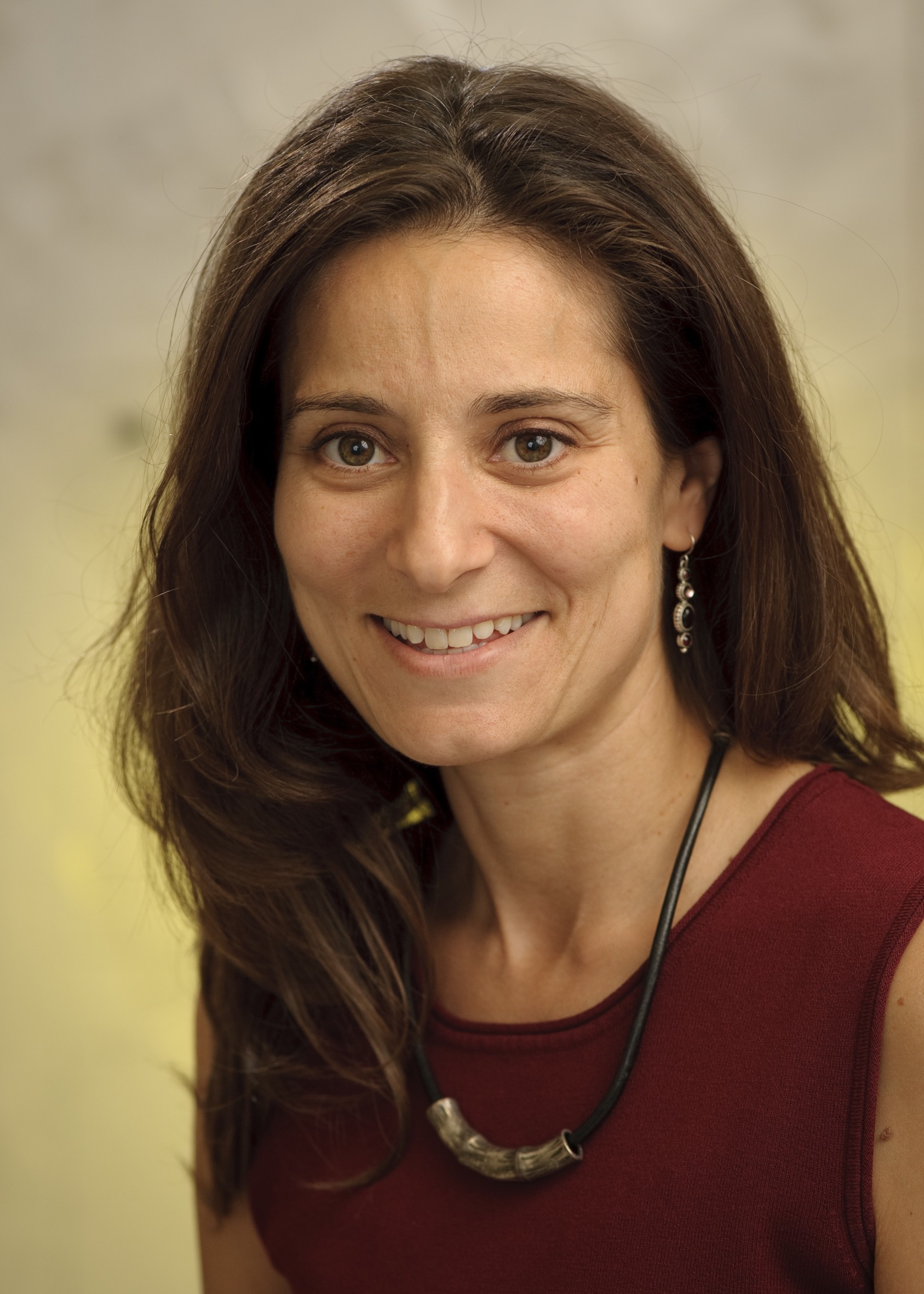
- Natalie Batalha
- Born: May 14, 1966 (age 60); California, U.S.
- Education: UC Santa Cruz (Ph.D.); University of California, Berkeley (S.B.)
- Known for: Kepler Mission
- Awards: Time 100 (2017); Smithsonian American Ingenuity Award (2017)
- Scientific career
- Fields: Astronomy; Exoplanets
- Workplaces: UC Santa Cruz

Natalie M. Batalha (born May 14, 1966) is professor of Astronomy and Astrophysics at UC Santa Cruz. Previously she was a research astronomer in the Space Sciences Division of NASA Ames Research Center and held the position of Science Team Lead (2010 - 2012), Mission Scientist (2012 - 2016), and Project Scientist (2016 - 2018) on the Kepler Mission, the first mission capable of finding Earth-size planets around other stars. Before moving to NASA, Batalha was a Professor of Physics and Astronomy at San Jose State University (2002 - 2012).

== Biography ==
Batalha grew up in the San Francisco Bay Area, and attended the University of California, Berkeley. Though she started out as a business major, she switched to physics after learning that everyday occurrences like thin-film interference (why rainbows appear on soap bubbles and oily puddles) could be described mathematically. During her undergraduate, she worked as a stellar spectroscopist, studying Sun-like stars. After graduating with her bachelor's degree in physics, she pursued a doctorate in astrophysics from UC Santa Cruz, and completed a post-doctoral fellowship in Rio de Janeiro, Brazil.

Batalha is married to Celso Batalha, a Brazilian-born professor of astronomy and physics at a nearby community college, Evergreen Valley College. Their daughter Natasha Batalha is also an astronomer. Natalie and Natasha Batalha have collaborated on projects that discover and describe exoplanets found using the James Webb Space Telescope.

== Career ==
In 1997, William Borucki added Batalha to the science team and she started work on transit photometry. She has been involved with the Kepler Mission since the design and funding, and as one of the original Co-Investigators was responsible for the selection of the more than 150,000 stars monitored by the telescope. She now works closely with team members at Ames Research Center to identify viable planets from the data of the Kepler mission. She led the analysis that yielded the discovery in 2011 of Kepler 10b, the first confirmed rocky planet outside the Solar System.

In November 2017, the Space Telescope Science Institute selected 13 programs for Director's Discretionary Early Release Science (DD-ERS) on the James Webb Space Telescope. Of a total of 460 observation hours allocated, Batalha's project, 'The Transiting Exoplanet Community Early Release Science Program', was awarded 86.9 hours; the highest of any DD-ERS program on the JWST. These observation hours are allocated to be used during the first five months of the telescope's operation.

Batalha leads the UC Santa Cruz Astrobiology Initiative, a collaborative, interdisciplinary initiative dedicated to the study of the origin, evolution, and distribution of life in the universe.

Following the successful launch of the James Webb Space Telescope in 2021, Batalha and a team of researchers found unambiguous evidence of carbon dioxide in the atmosphere of an exoplanet. The team used JWST to observe a Saturn-mass planet called WASP-39b which orbits very close to a Sun-like star about 700 light-years from Earth.

Batalha, along with Mark Clampin, Astrophysics Division Director, National Aeronautics and Space Administration, and Steven L. Finkelstein, Professor of Astronomy, University of Texas at Austin, testified before the House of Representatives Committee on Science, Space, and Technology, Subcommittee on Space and Aeronautics in 2022.

Batalha and the JWST Transiting Exoplanet Early Release Science Team used the James Webb Space Telescope in 2023 to identify water vapor in the atmosphere of WASP-18b and make a temperature map of the planet as it slipped behind, and reappeared from, its star.

== Presentations ==
Batalha presented 'A Planet for Goldilocks' at Talks at Google in 2016. She presented 'From Lava Worlds to Living Worlds' at Breakthrough Initiatives in 2019.

== Recognition ==
In 2011, Batalha was awarded NASA's Exceptional Public Service Medal for outstanding leadership of the Kepler Science Team.

In 2017, Batalha and two other exoplanet scientists were named to Time Magazine's 100 Most Influential People in the World. In the same year, Batalha won Smithsonian Magazine's American Ingenuity Award in Physical Sciences.

In 2018, Batalha received the UC Santa Cruz Alumni Achievement award.

In 2019, Batalha earned an honorary doctorate from the Faculty of Science and Technology at the University of Uppsala, Sweden.

Batalha was elected a member of the American Academy of Arts and Sciences in 2019 and a Legacy Fellow of the American Astronomical Society in 2020.

In 2020, Batalha was appointed as a UC Presidential Chair for her work on the UCSC Astrobiology Initiative.

Batalha has been awarded several named lectureships, including the James T. Bunyan Lecturer (2011, Stanford University), the Rittenhouse Lecturer (2015, University of Pennsylvania), the Walter Stibbs Lecturer (2016, University of Sydney), the Beatrice Hill Tinsley Lecturer (2017, New Zealand), the Carl Sagan Distinguished Lecturer (2018, Cornell University), the Celsius Lecturer, (2018, Uppsala University), the John N. Bahcall Distinguished Lecturer (2019, Space Telescope Science Institute), and the UCSC Faculty Research Lecturer (2024, University of California, Santa Cruz).

== See also ==
- List of women in leadership positions on astronomical instrumentation projects
