= Batalha Square =

Welcome To Portugal

Coordinates: 41.1453°N 8.6071°W

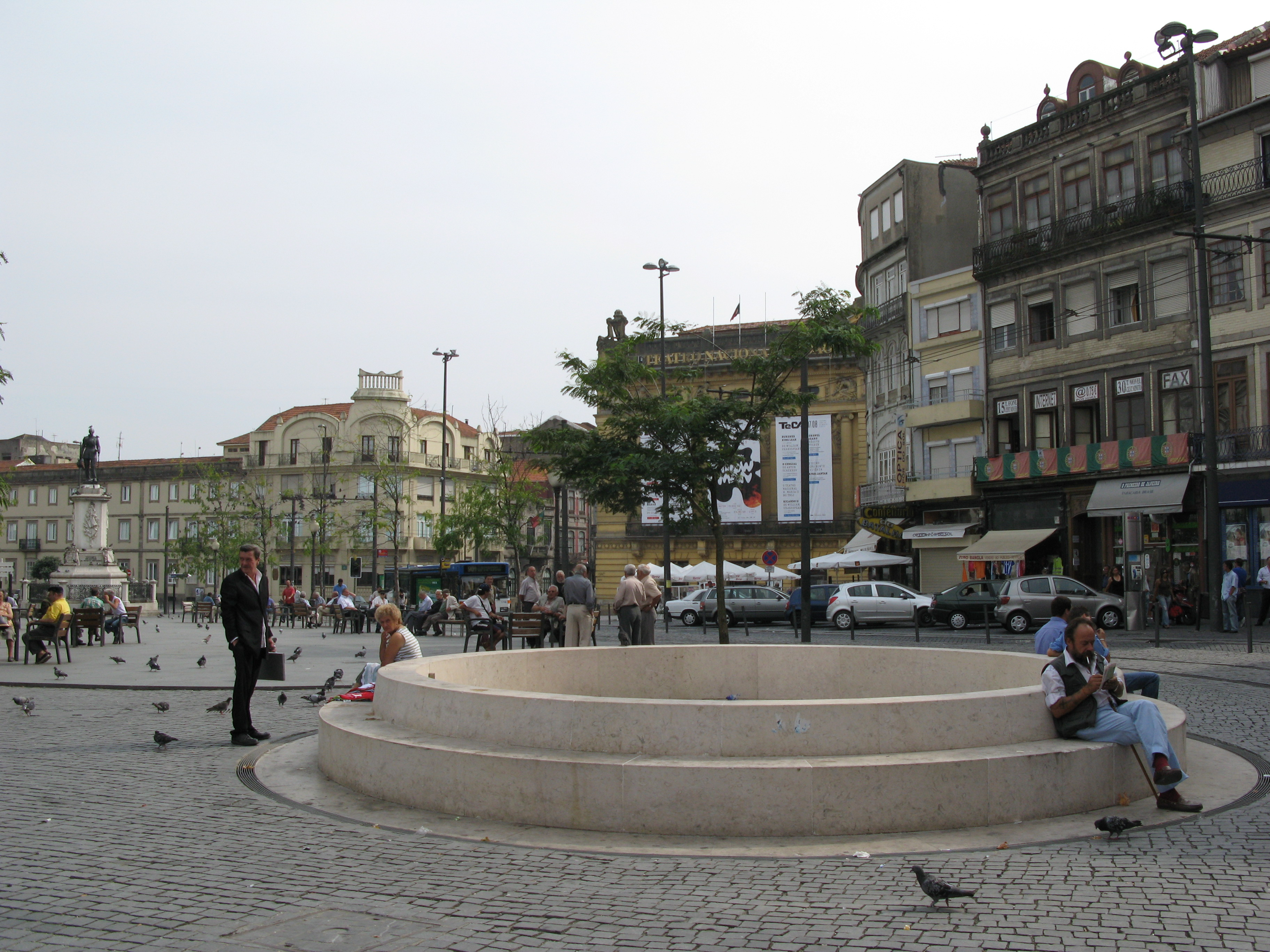
View of Batalha Square.

Batalha Square (Portuguese: Praça da Batalha) is a historical public square located in the city of Porto, in Portugal.

== Origin of the name ==
According to tradition, the name batalha (battle) comes from a 10th-century battle fought between the Moorish forces of Al-Mansur Ibn Abi Aamir and the inhabitants of Porto, which resulted in the defeat of the latter and the destruction of the city.

== Overview ==
An important monument of the square is the Batalha Palace, a good example of a late 18th-century urban palace of Porto. The main façade, in a style intermediate between baroque and neoclassical, carries the coat-of-arms of the former owners (Silvas, Guedes, Melos e Pereiras). During the Siege of Porto (1832) the owners left the building and it was used for several purposes, including blood hospital. The interior has been stripped of its decoration still in the 19th century. Nowadays it is used as post office.

The square was urbanised in 1861, when a statue of King Pedro V of Portugal, standing over a pedestal, was erected right in front of Batalha Palace. The statue is a work by sculptor Teixeira Lopes (father) which was inaugurated in 1866.

The Batalha area has been an important cultural spot for centuries. In 1794, it was here that the Oporto's opera house, the Royal Theatre of São João, was built. The theatre still exists, although the original building had to be replaced in 1908 following a fire. Another important cultural venue of the square is the Cinema Batalha, a landmark of Portuguese Art Deco architecture dating from 1947.

Batalha Square was an important traffic hub until recently, but since the 1980s it has been mostly pedestrianised. The square is also a touristic spot thanks to its monuments, cafés and hotels.

== See also ==
- Porto
- Liberdade Square
- Ribeira Square
- Rotunda da Boavista
