= Covelinhas railway station =

Railway station in Portugal

Covelinhas Station Estação Ferroviária de Covelinhas
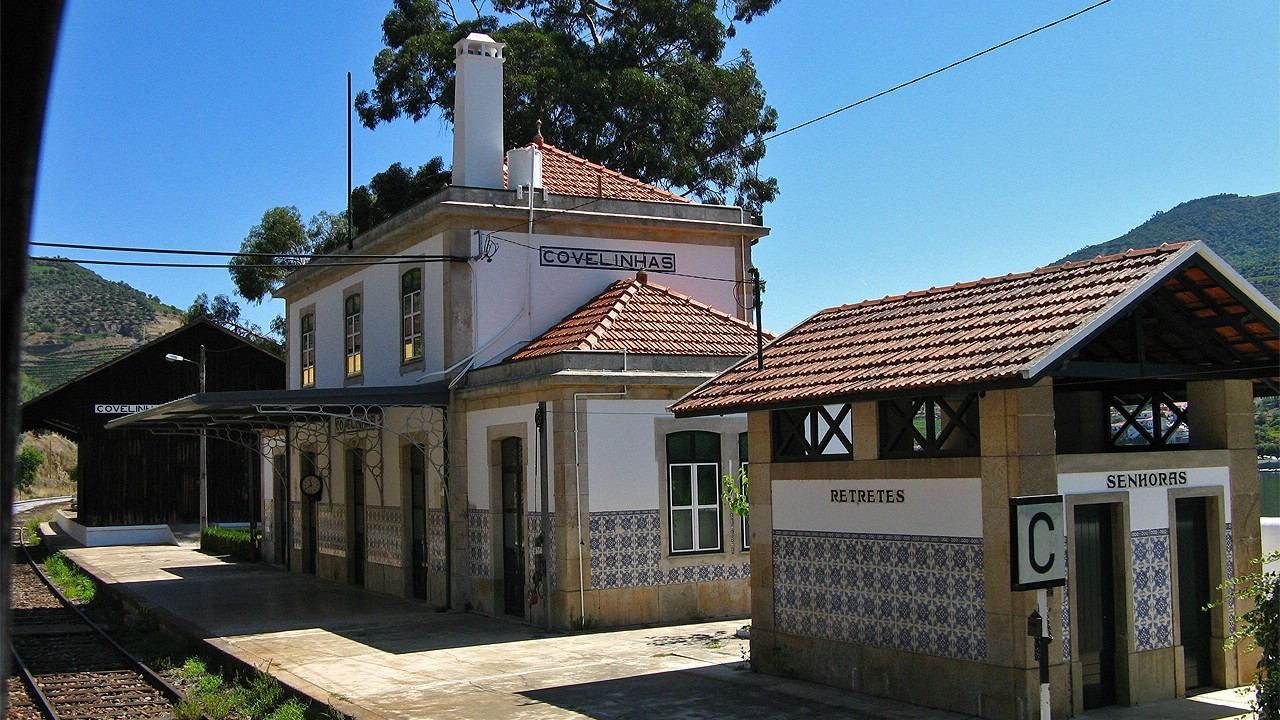
- Main building of the Covelinhas railway station, in 2009

General information
- Location: Covelinhas; Portugal
- Coordinates: 41.152184°N 7.688292°W
- Line: Douro line (1880-present)
- Platforms: 2
- Tracks: 2
- Connections: Régua railway station, Ferrão halt

Other information
- Website: https://www.cp.pt/passageiros/pt/consultar-horarios/estacoes/covelinhas

History
- Opened: 4 April 1880

Services
Preceding station	Comboios de Portugal	Following station
Régua towards Porto-Campanhã	InterRegional	Ferrão towards Pocinho
Régua towards Porto-São Bento	InterRegional	Ferrão towards Pocinho
Régua Terminus	Regional	Ferrão towards Pocinho
Régua towards Porto-São Bento	InterRegional	Ferrão towards Pinhão
Régua towards Marco de Canaveses	Regional	Ferrão towards Pinhão
Location
- Location within Portugal

The Covelinhas Railway Station is an interface on the Douro line, which serves the now extinct parish of Covelinhas, in the municipality of Peso da Régua, Portugal.

== History ==
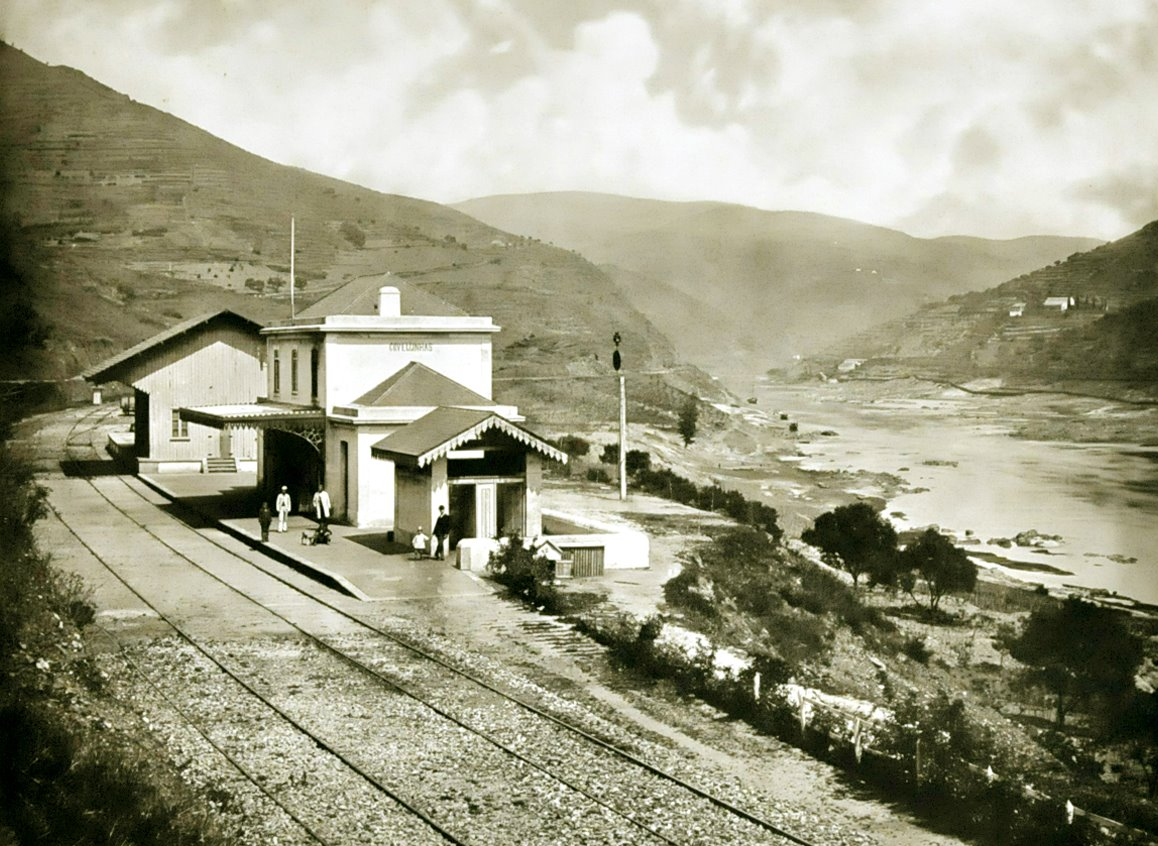
Covelinhas railway station in the 1880s

This interface is located on the section between Régua station and Ferrão halt on the Douro Line, which was inaugurated on 4 April 1880.

In 1901, a road was under construction, linking this station to the city of Vila Real, and it was planned to install another road between Armamar and the opposite bank of the Douro, in front of the station, in order to better serve the region south of the river.

On 28 October 1903, the government authorised the financing of several station access roads, including a 413 m long road between Covelinhas and the quay on the River Douro. However, in 1932 access to the station was still very primitive, with only paths for ox carts.

In 28 January 2013, Covelinhas parish was extinct and replaced by the Galafura and Covelinhas parish.
