= Régua railway station =

Railway station in Peso da Régua, Portugal

Régua Station Estação Ferroviária da Régua
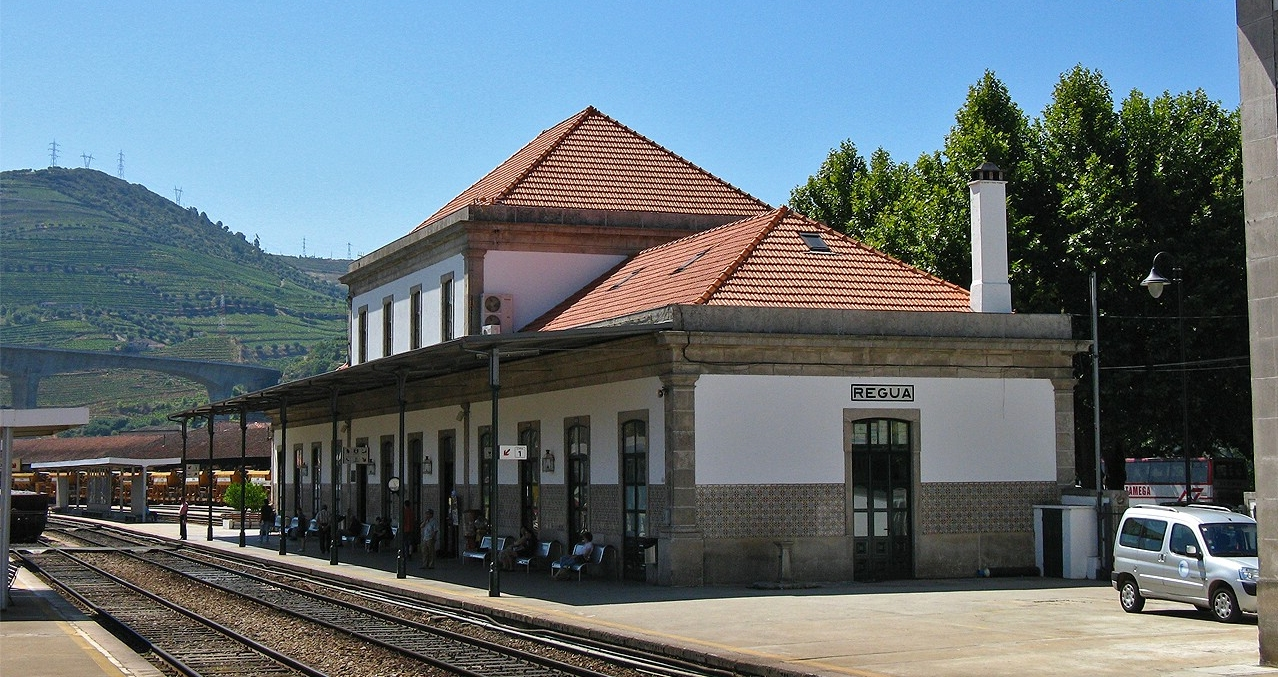
- Main building of the Régua station, in 2009

General information
- Location: Peso da Régua; Portugal
- Coordinates: 41°9′30.57″N 7°47′0.82″W
- Elevation: 75
- Lines: Douro line (1879-present), Corgo line (1906-2009)
- Tracks: 2
- Connections: Godim railway station, Covelinhas railway station

History
- Opened: 15 July 1879

Services
Preceding station	Comboios de Portugal	Following station
Rede towards Porto-São Bento	InterRegional	Terminus
Rede towards Porto-Campanhã	InterRegional	Terminus
Godim towards Marco de Canaveses	Regional	Terminus
Godim towards Marco de Canaveses	Regional	Covelinhas towards Pinhão
Rede towards Porto-São Bento	InterRegional	Covelinhas towards Pinhão
Rede towards Porto-São Bento	InterRegional	Covelinhas towards Pocinho
Rede towards Porto-Campanhã	InterRegional	Covelinhas towards Pocinho
Terminus	Regional	Covelinhas towards Pocinho
Location
- Location within Portugal

The Régua railway station previously known as Regoa railway station, is a station on the Douro Line, which serves the town of Peso da Régua, in the District of Vila Real, in Portugal. It opened in 1879, and served as a junction point with the Corgo Line, which operated between 1906 and 2009.

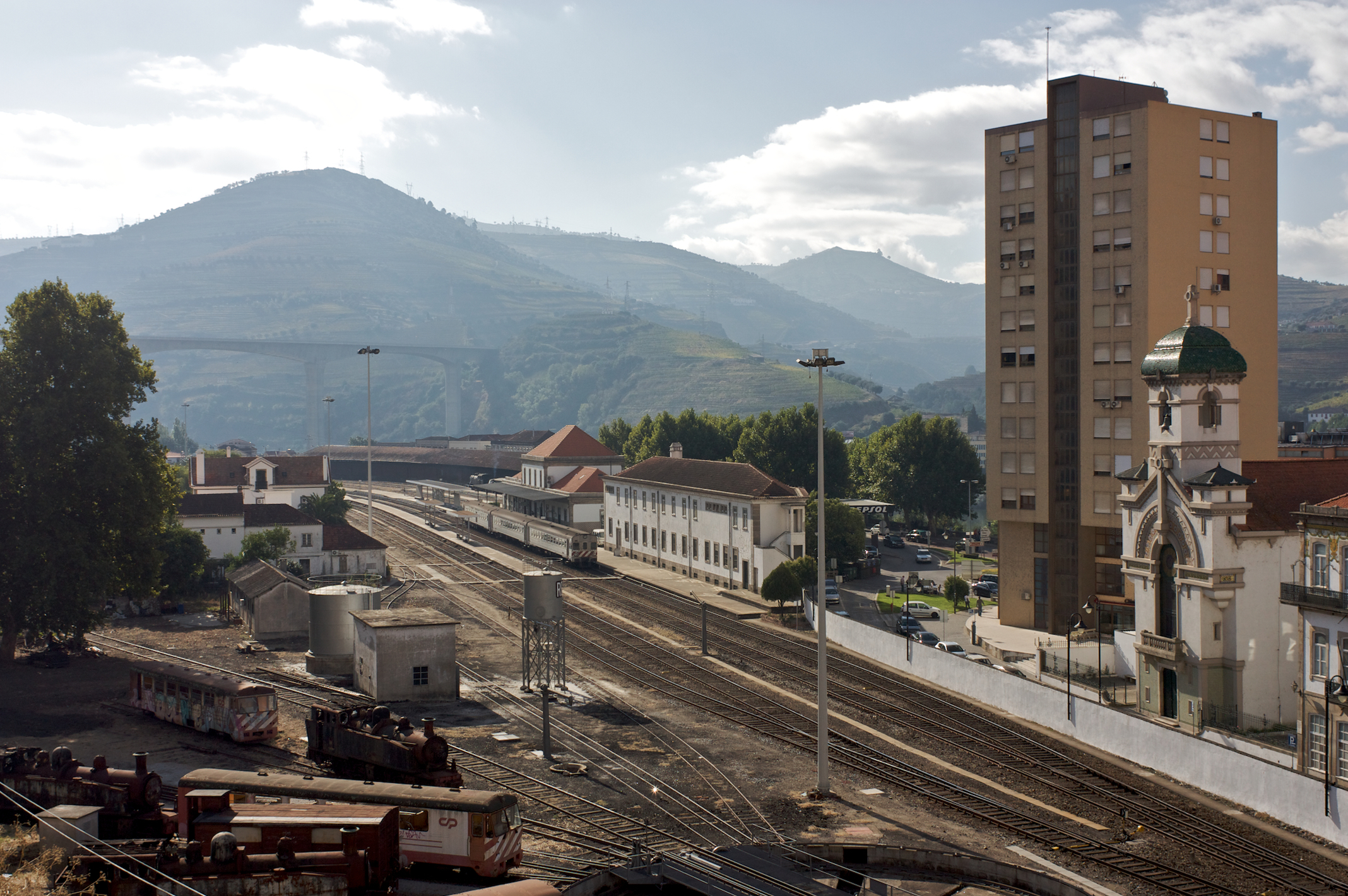
Station at its surroundings in 2010

The station is located in the town of Peso da Régua, with access by the Largo da estação (Square of the station).

By January 2011, the station had a total of four lanes, measuring 379, 438, 350 and 319 m long, the platforms are 255 and 216 m wide, and 35 cm high. Since October 2004, diesel fueling maneuvers can be carried out, and the station also has a public information system. The passenger building is located on the south side of the road (right side going up towards Barca d'Alva).

In 1994, it was served by regional trains, for the transport of private cars, by the operator Comboios de Portugal.

== History ==
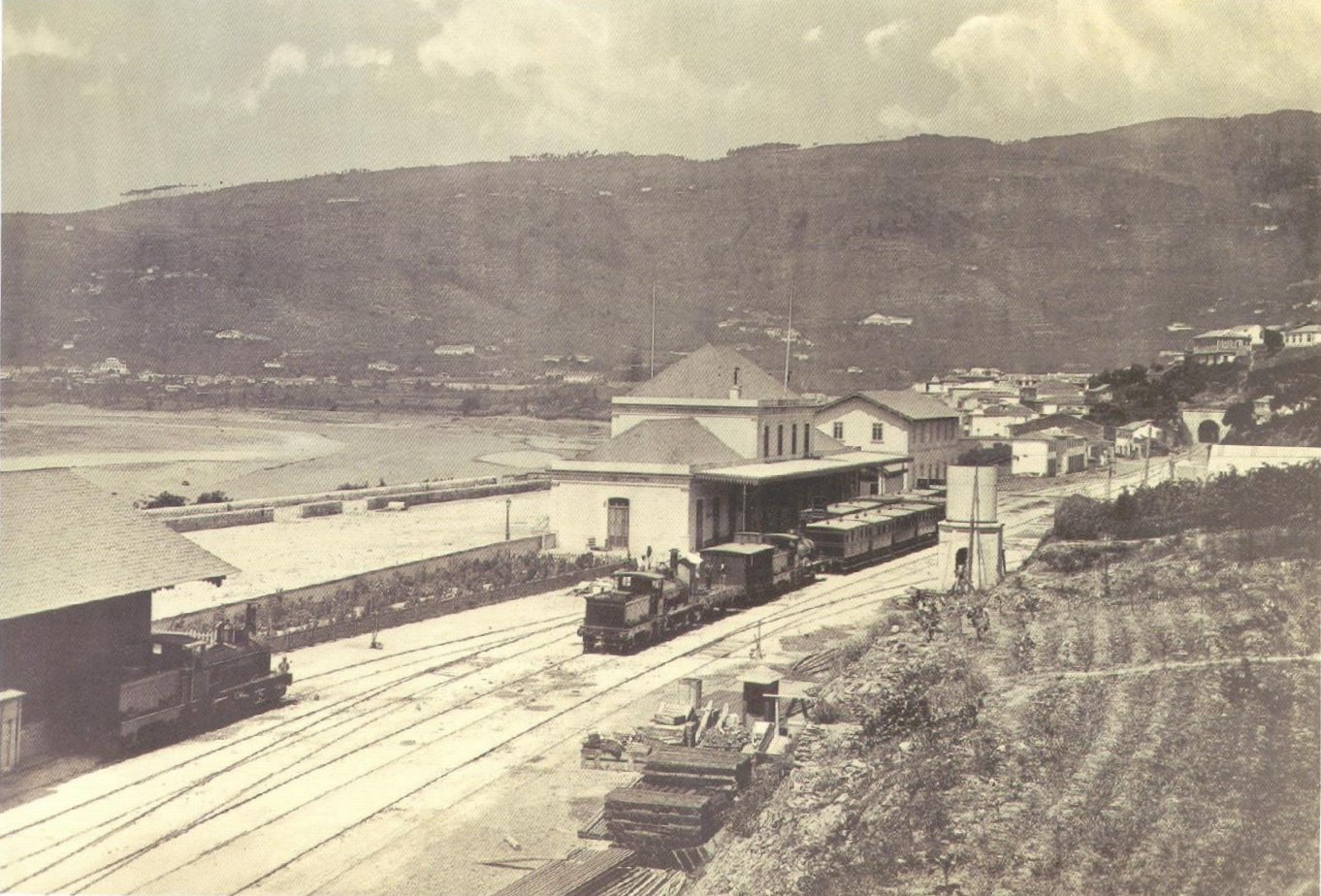
Régua station, in the 1880s.

=== Background ===
Before the construction of the Douro line, the regions surrounding the Douro river far from the Atlantic Ocean had a huge lack of communication with the rest of Portugal, with the river being the only way to receive or send any message, however, the voyage by boat was very complicated and took a lot of time, taking between 6 and 8 days to reach from Peso da Régua to Porto and vice-versa. By the late 1880s, the famous ethnographer, José Leite de Vasconcelos, took a trip from Peso da Régua to Miranda do Douro that took 5 days.

=== Inauguration ===
The station was inaugurated on 15 July 1879, as a provisory station of the Douro line. Connection to Ferrão railway station, opened on 4 Abril 1880.

=== 20th century ===
==== Connection to the Corgo line ====
Still in the 19th century, the German businessman Maximilian Schreck was authorized to build Horsecar railway lines between Vila Real, Régua, Lamego and Viseu.

A decree of February 18, 1903 states that attempts to build a railway between Régua and the border with Spain were being made. In September 1905, a plan for expanding this station had already been prepared and presented to the Superior Council of Public Works, in order to accommodate both the Corgo Line, then under construction, and the planned Linha de Lamego. The first section of the Corgo Line, between Régua and Vila Real, was opened to exploration on May 12, 1906.

In 1913, stagecoach service from Régua station to Lamego and Moimenta da Beira started. In 1919, circulation on the section between Vila Real and Régua was temporarily suspended, due to the monarchic incursions happening in northern Portugal.

==== Enlargement ====
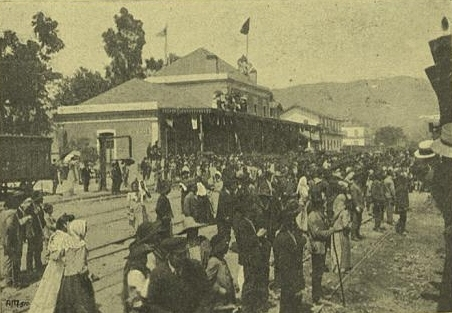
Portuguese royal train in the Régua railway station, 1907.

Due to being the junction point of two separate railway lines and an important road junction, the town of Régua has become a major communications center between the regions of Beira and Trás-os-Montes. The station itself became an important Port wine transporter, still, the station did not have the conditions to meet the traffic requirements, but it could not be enlarged due to the reduced space available, so it was decided to expand the then Godim halt (modern Godim railway station) instead, located near Régua. On that same year, Régua station was partially repaired by the Portuguese Railway Company. In April 1935, those expansions were almost done, that included sleeping quarters for the construction workers.

A decree from November 18, 1911 modified the rules for transporting Port wine on the Douro line. The wine that was transported by train to Barqueiros, Rede and Moledo was to be verified at a post in Barqueiros, but the rest was to be verified at Régua.

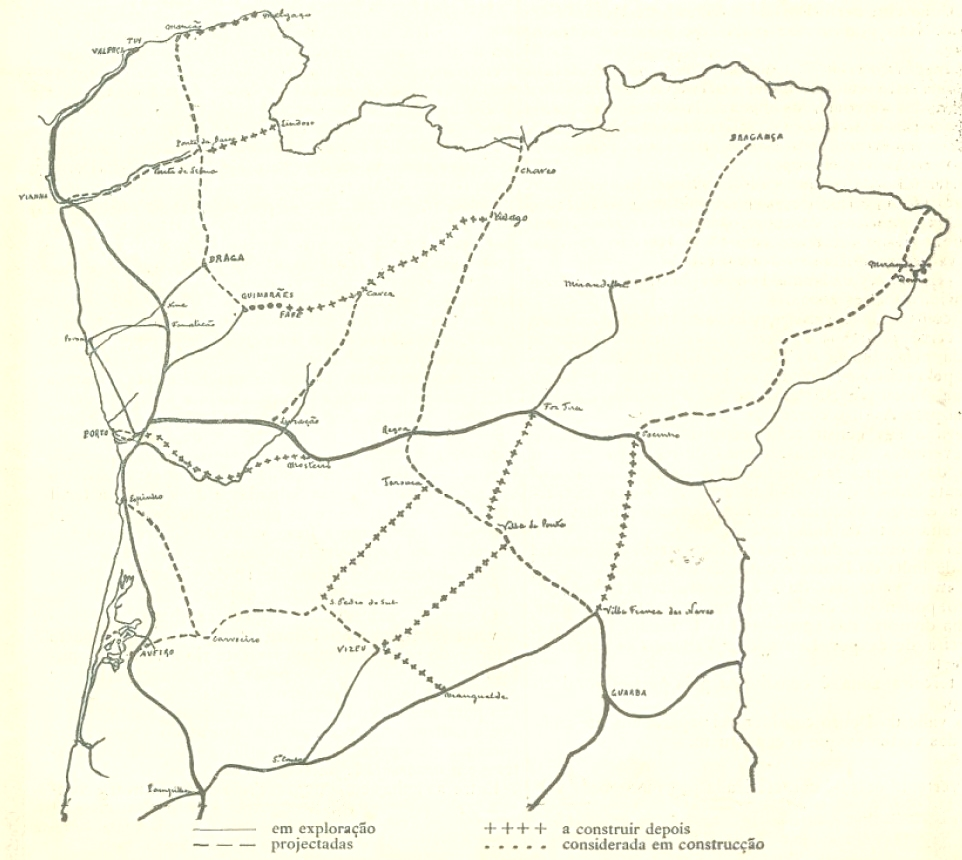
Plan for the Complementary railway network North of the Mondego River, enacted in 1900. In addition to the Corgo Line, a line from Régua to Vila Franca das Naves was also planned.

==== Planned connections to other lines ====
In 1885, a railway link between Viseu and Chaves was planned, but it was never completed due to the considerable difficulties that would be encountered in its construction; therefore, two alternatives were proposed, with the military authorities supporting the line from Régua to Viseu via Lamego. However, Régua was unable to support the junction of the broad gauge railway, and the problem of building on very difficult terrain remained, so a commission formed in 1927 to study and sketch a plan for the railway network north of the Douro river proposed the installation of two narrow gauge lines, one from Régua to Lamego, and the other from this town to São Pedro do Sul railway station, passing through Castro Daire.

These two lines were included in the General Railway Network Plan, a document made official by Decree number 18190 of March 28, 1930, and the Lamego line was planned to reach Pinhel, passing through Vila Franca das Naves. A rail link between Régua and Vila Franca das Naved had already been presented, on a narrow gauge, by the Plan for the Complementary Network to the North of the Mondego, approved by a decree of 15 February 1900.

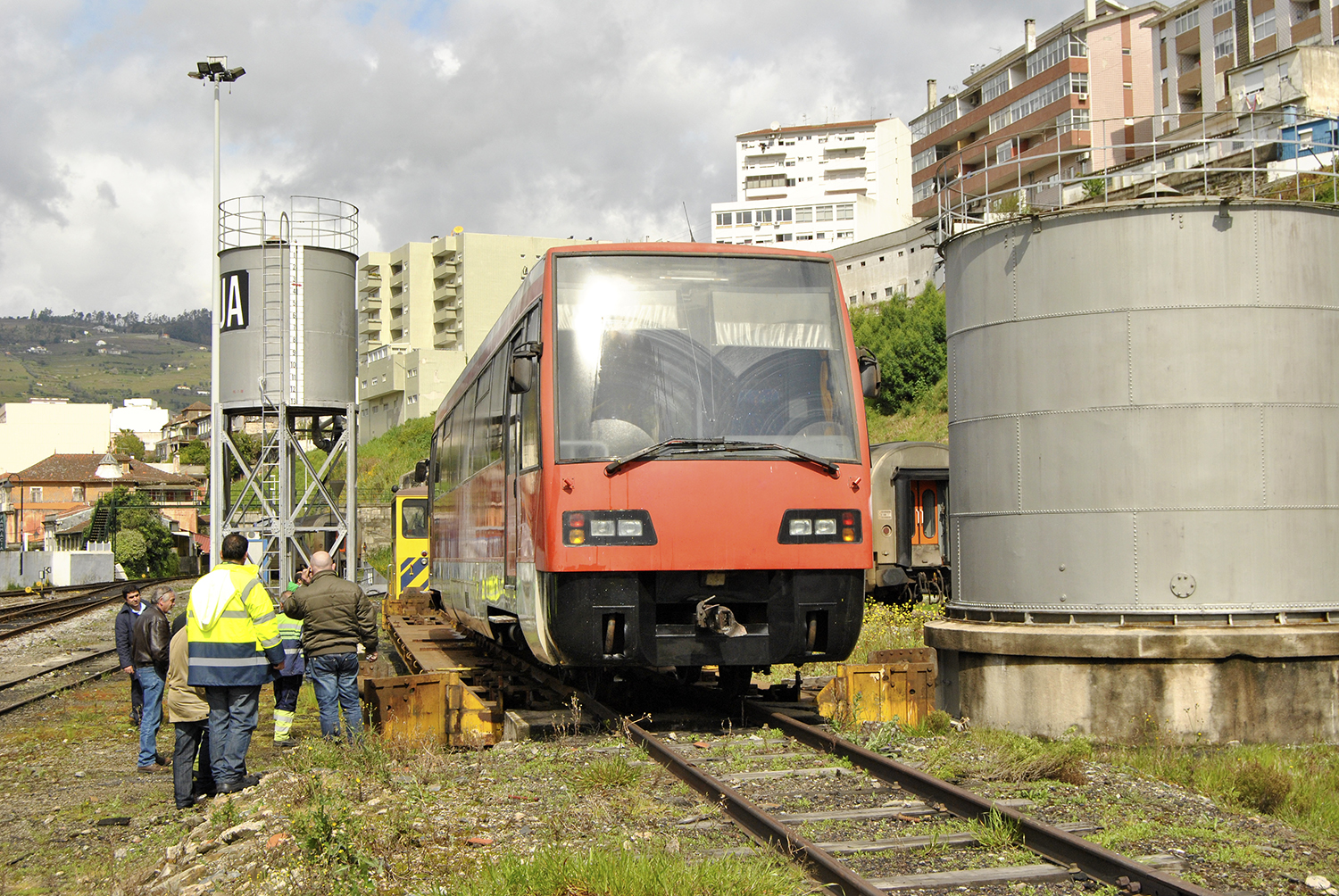
CP Class 9500 being transferred to a wide-track wagon following the closure of the Corgo line.

==== Modernization ====
In 1996, it was expected that the installation of electronic signaling would be extended to Régua, within the scope of the Porto Junction Railway Cabinet project.

=== 21st Century ===
The section of the Corgo line between Régua and Vila Real was closed by the National Railway Network on 25 March 2009. In 2016, the entire railway infrastructure on dual gauge was dismantled between the Régua railway station and Corgo, which provided the connection between the trunk of the Corgo line and the maintenance, manoeuvring and commercial (passenger and freight) facilities in Régua, thus making it impossible to reopen the operation in the future on Iberian-gauge railways.

== Literary references ==
The writer Horacel Lopes described the station and the people of Régua, when going on a trip through the Douro line in the 1950s:

Régua, at the confluence of the lines of Alto-Douro, represents the winery center of this entire region, notable for its famous wines. All roads are linked and joined there, serving to transport the formidable production of nectar from the Alto-Douro, from this privileged land of wines, fruits and cereals. It is a village in full development and extremely picturesque, built on the side of the great river, which gives so much exuberance and beauty to this point favored by nature.

— Horacel Lopes, O que vi em Portugal (English: What I saw in Portugal) (1956): p. 260

== Gallery ==
Station of Régua
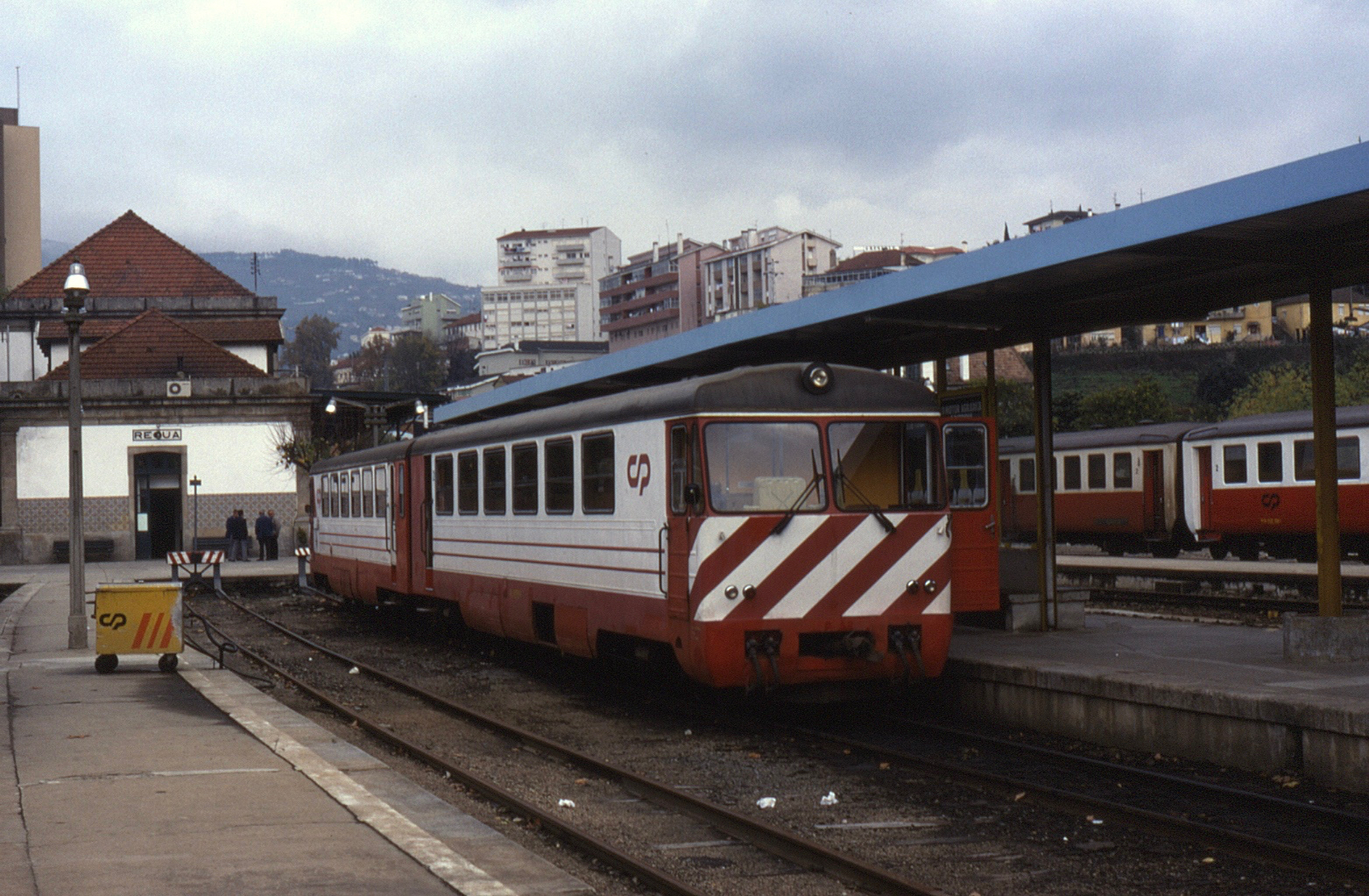
Train arrives at the Régua Railway Station in 1993

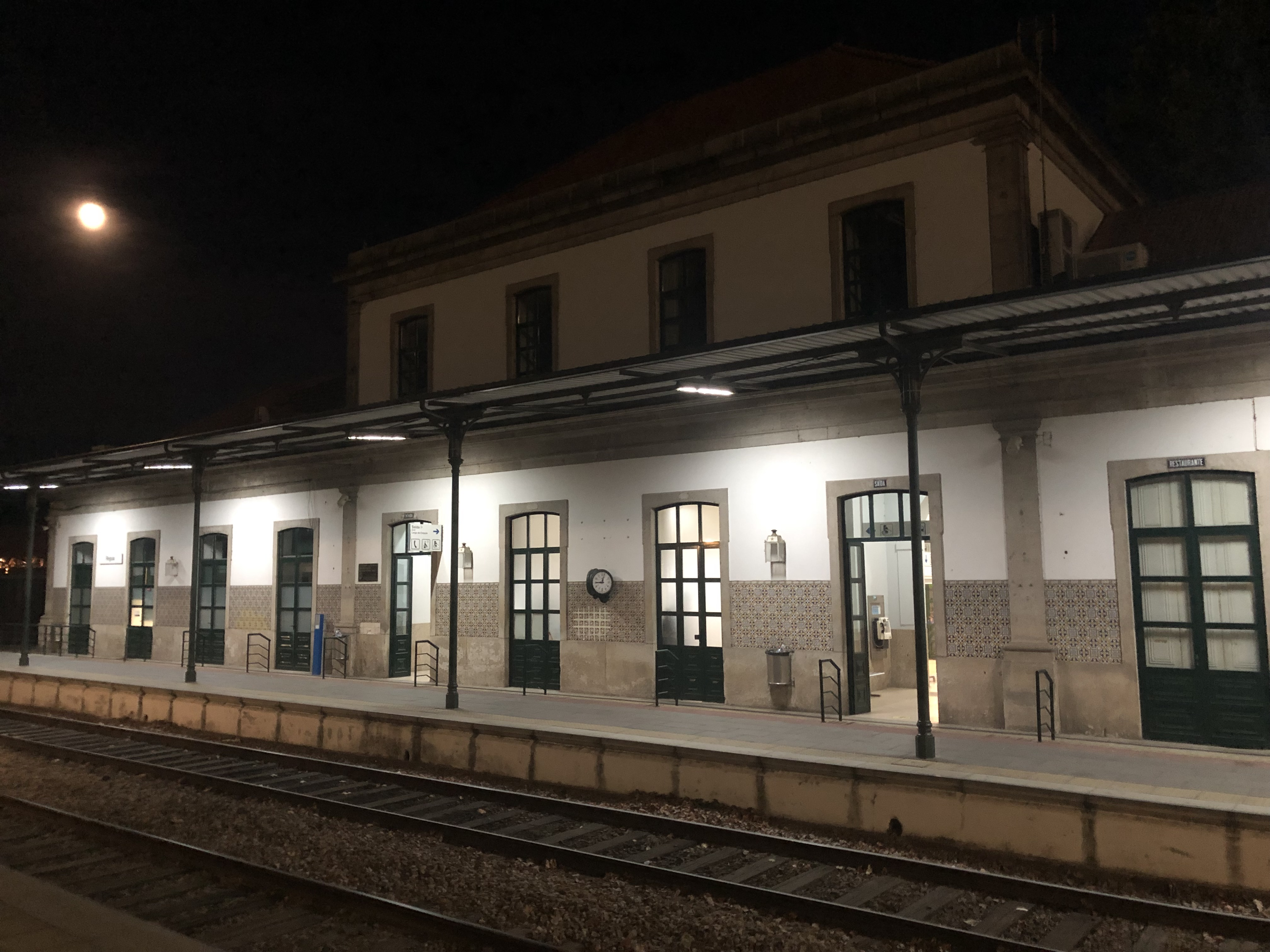
Train station during the night

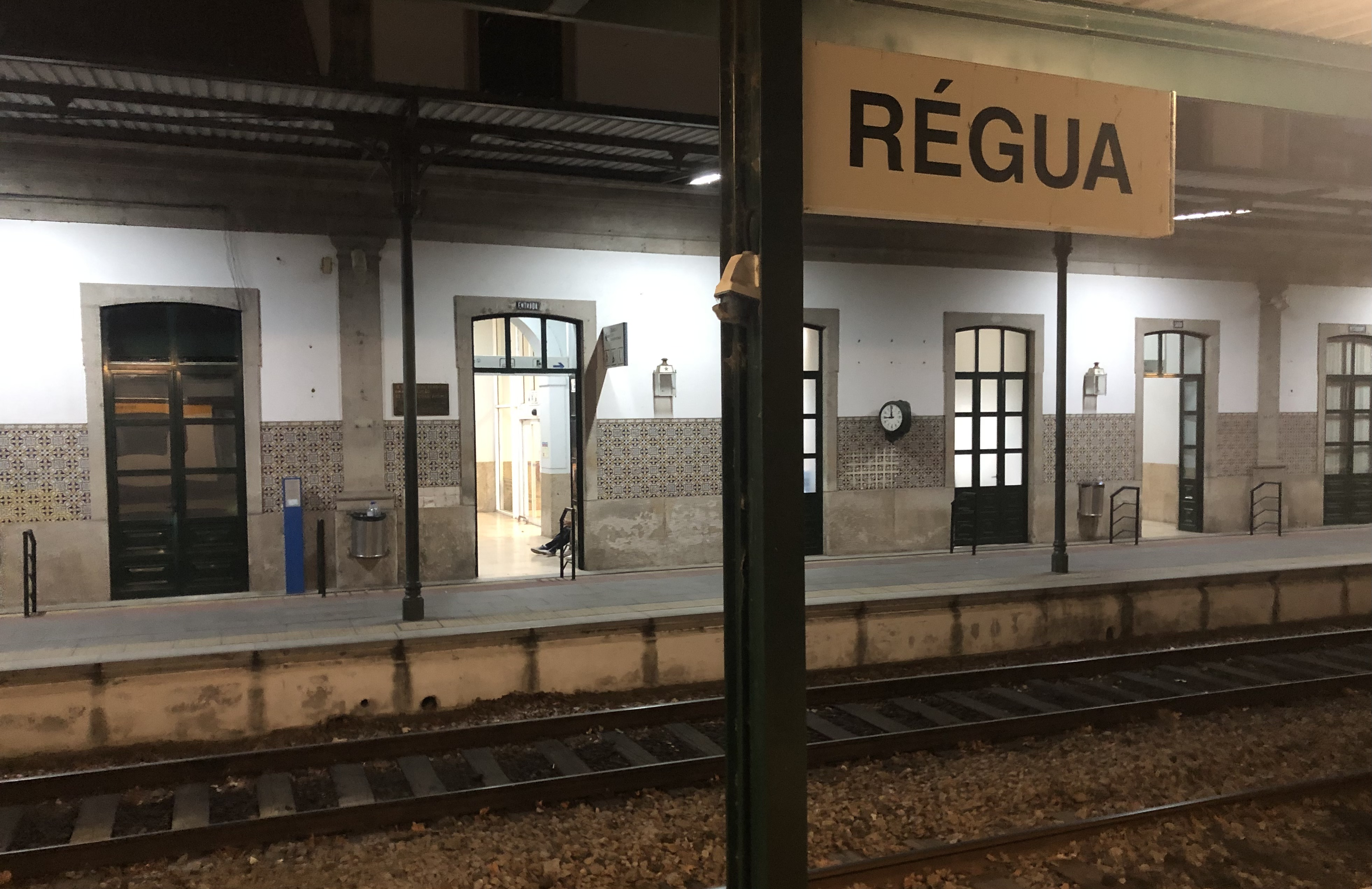
Train station during the night from inside a train

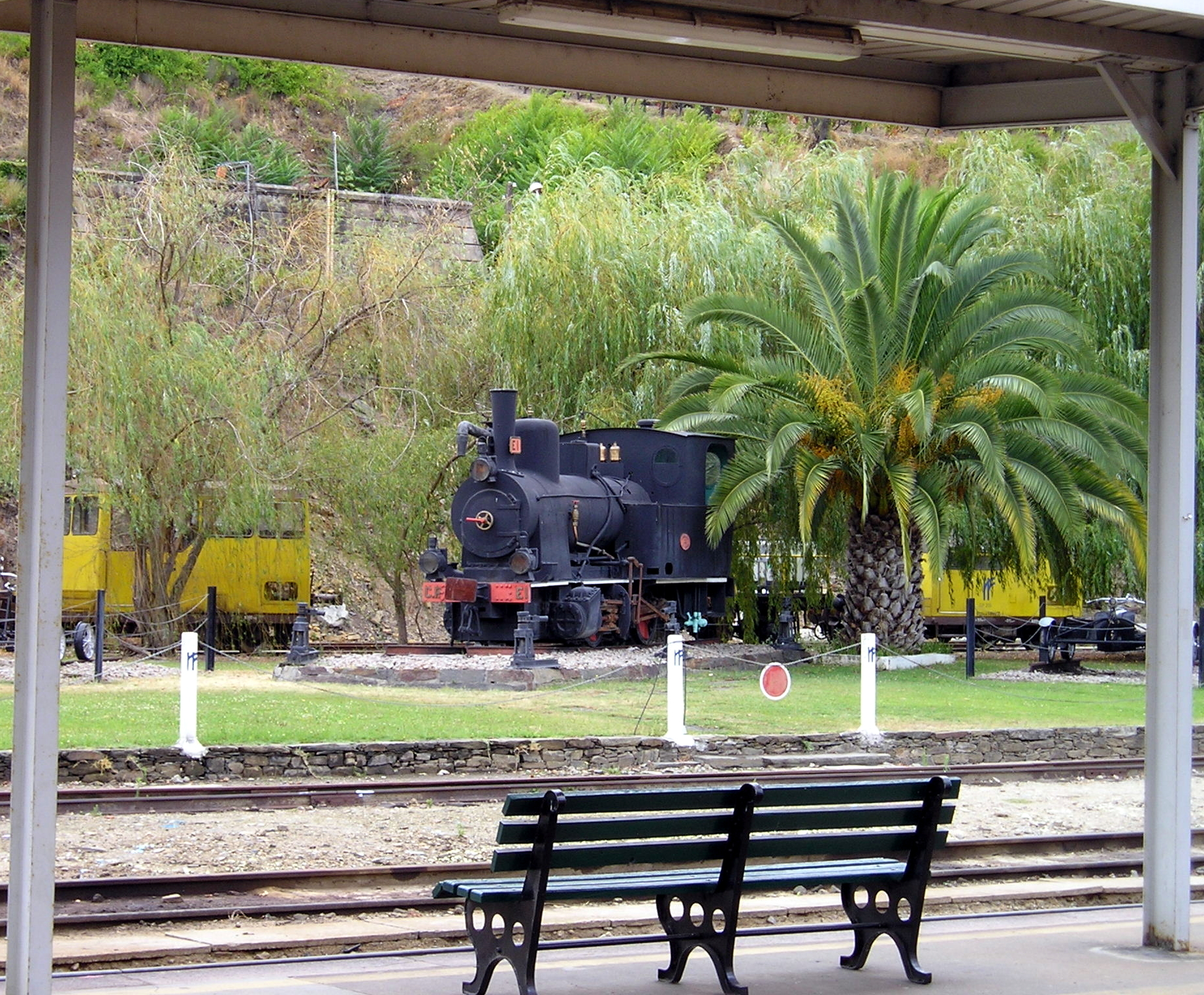
Steam locomotive used between 1922 and 1948

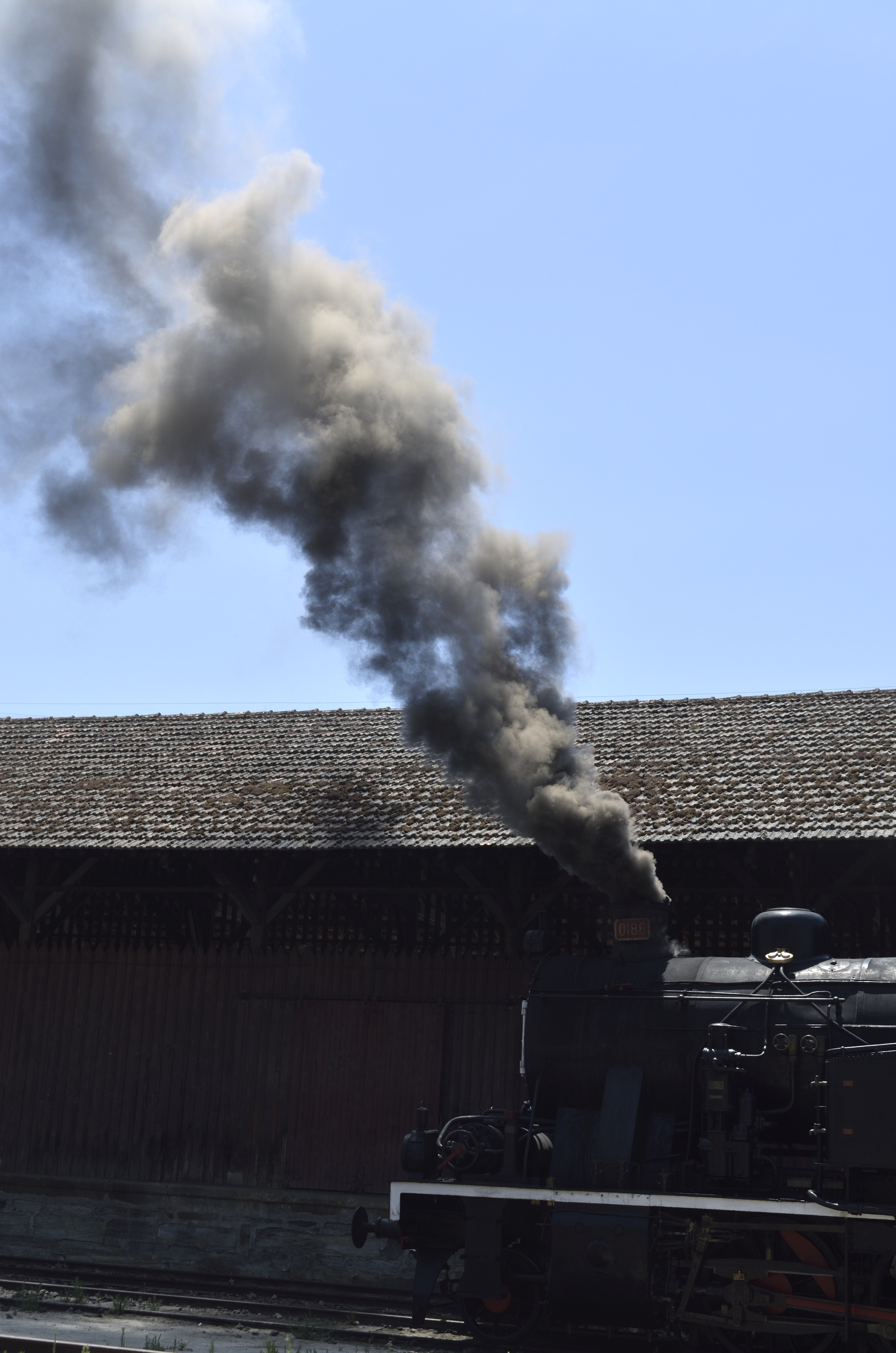
Historical steam locomotive passing by the Régua Railway Station, 2012

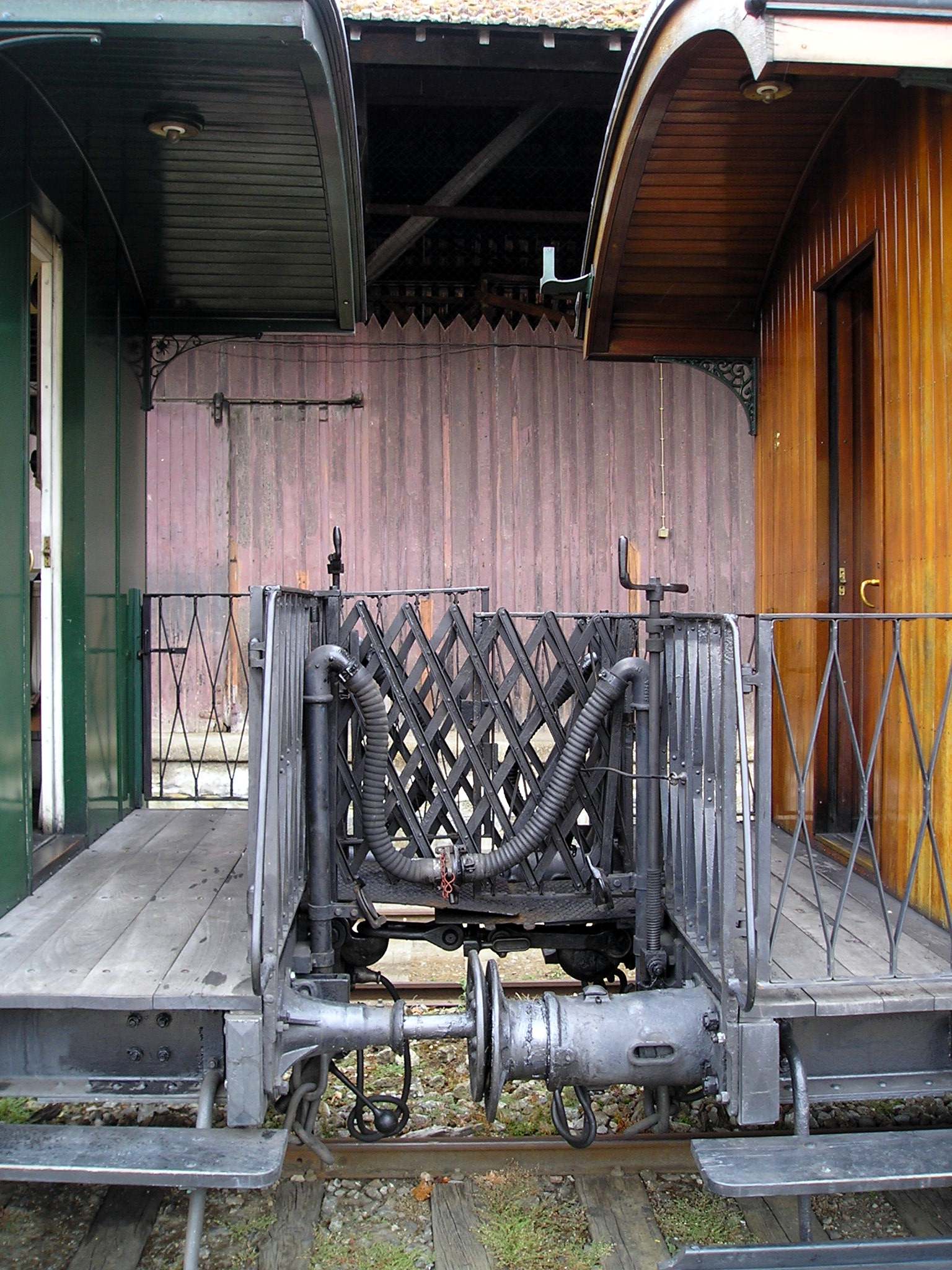
Old train carriages in Régua Station

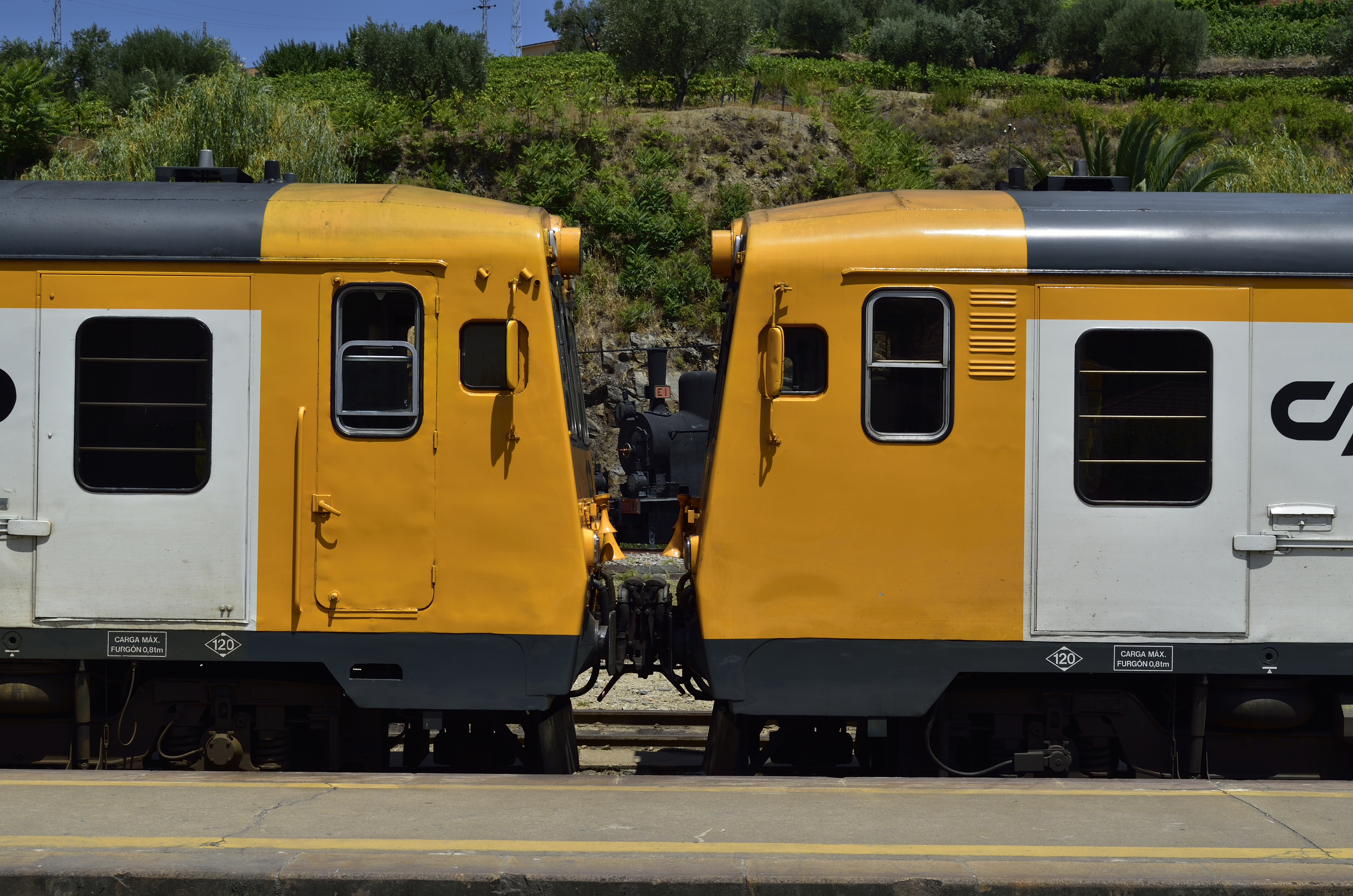
Modern train carriages in Régua Station

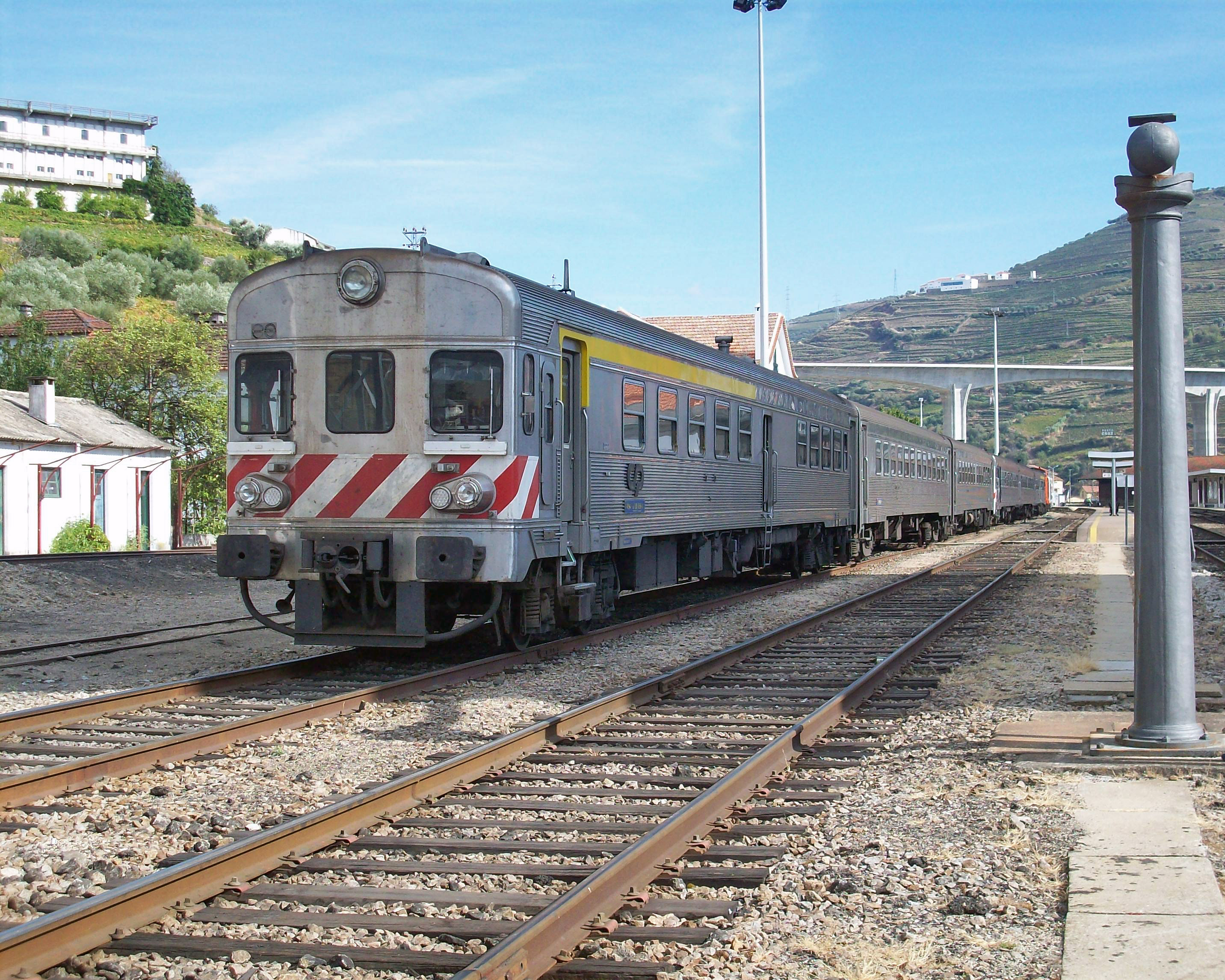
Train arriving at the station, 2010

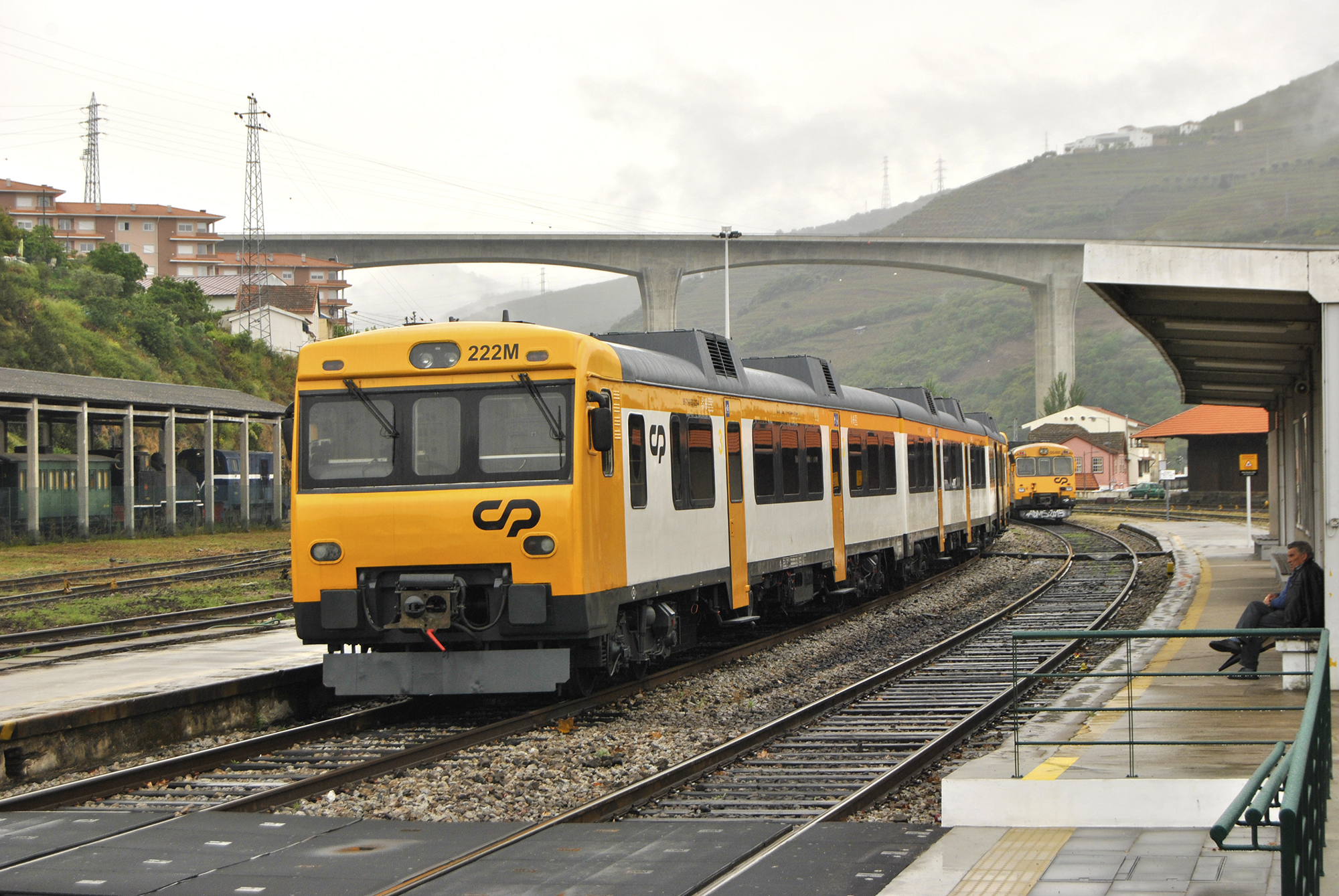
Train arriving at the station, 2015

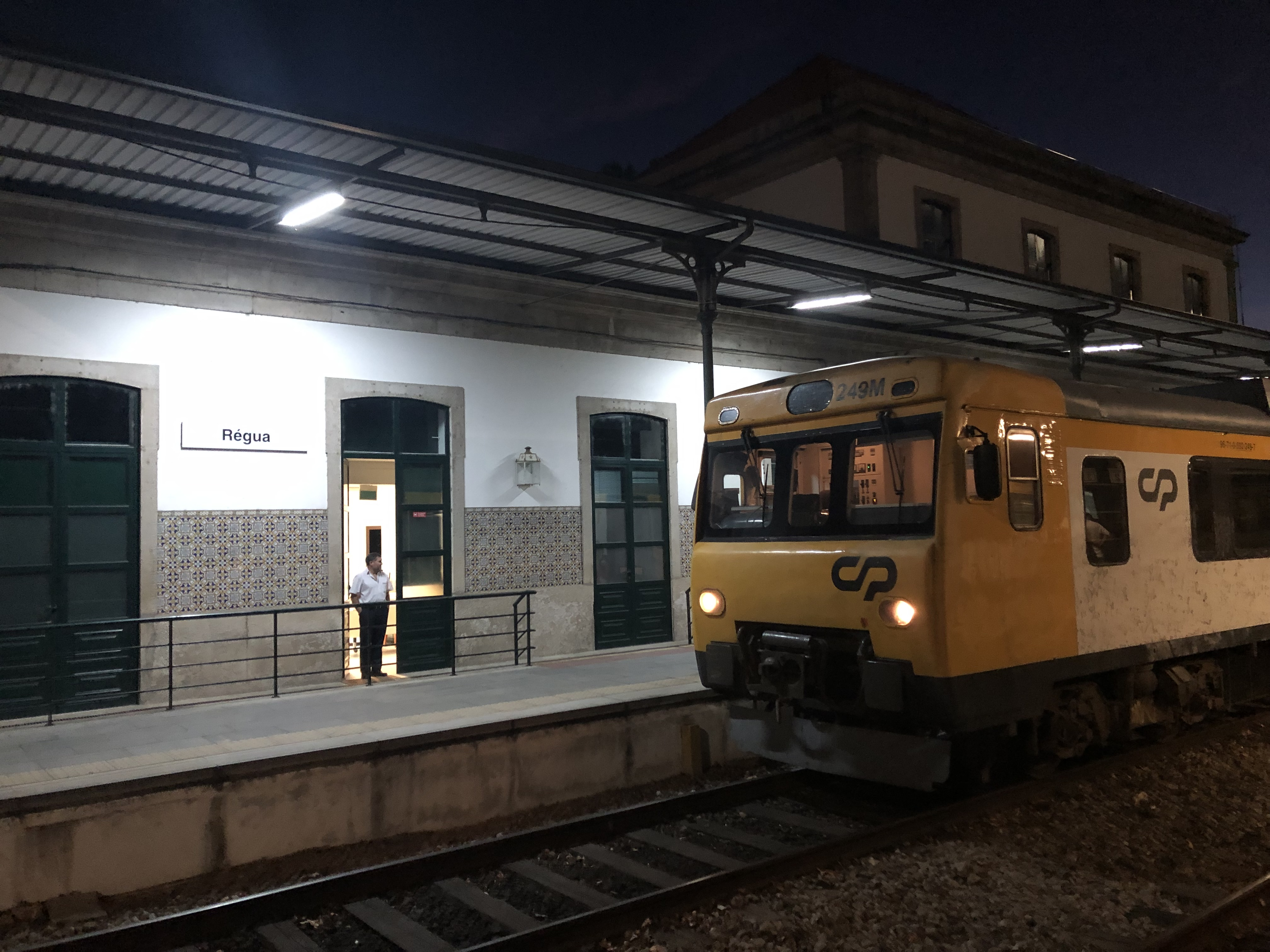
Train arriving at the station during the night, 2023

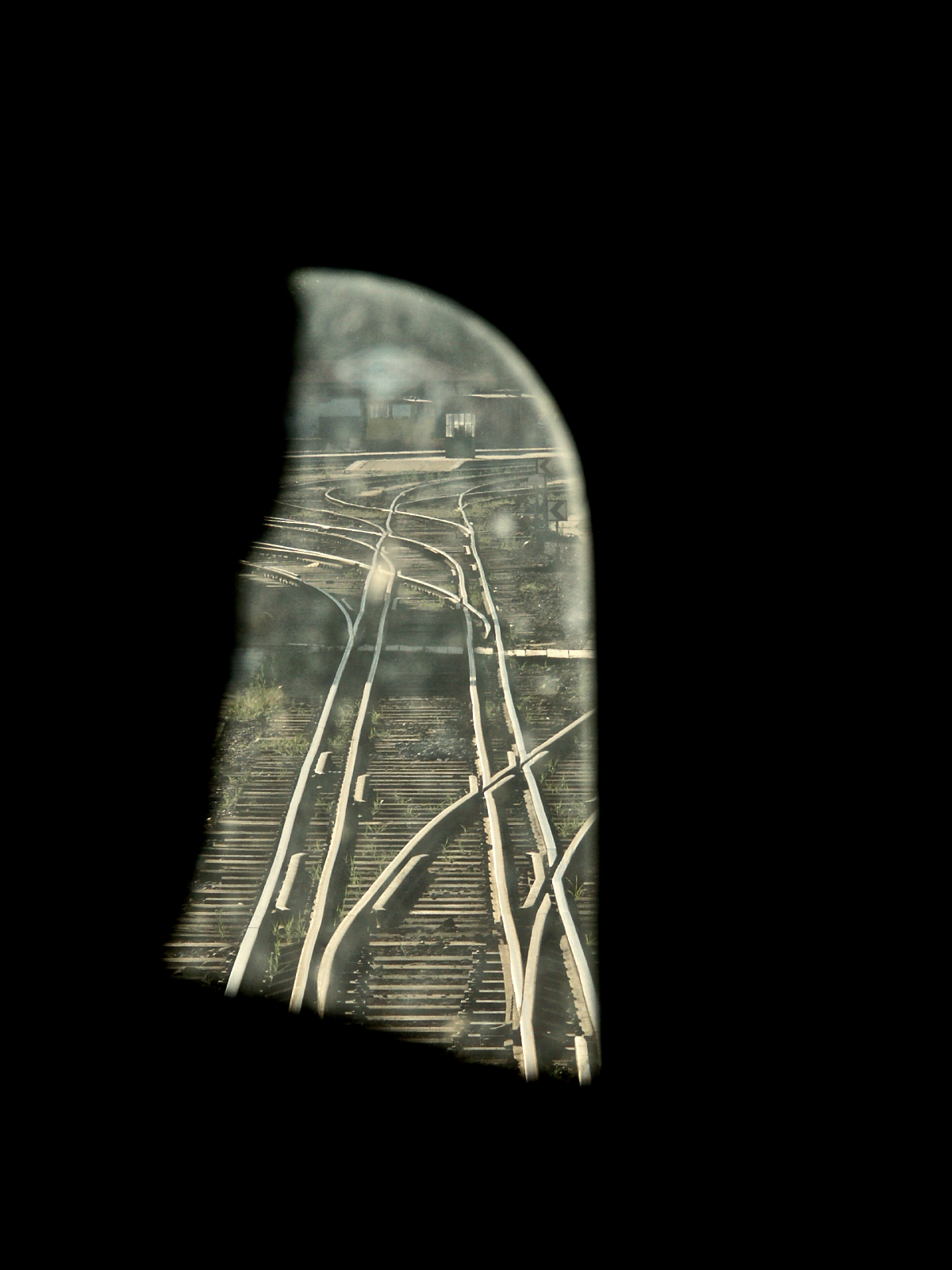
Dual gauge of the Corgo line inside the Douro line near Régua railway station, seen from the commander’s cabin, 2008.

== See also ==
- Comboios de Portugal
- Infraestruturas de Portugal
- Rail transport in Portugal
- History of rail transport in Portugal

== Bibliography ==
- Aires, Joaquim (2010). Vila Real: Roteiros Republicanos. Roteiros republicanos. Matosinhos: Quidnovi, Edição e Conteúdos, S. A. e Comissão Nacional para as Comemorações do Centenário da República. p. 128. ISBN 978-989-554-737-1.
- Jacob, João; Alves, Vítor (2010). Bragança: Roteiros Republicanos. Roteiros republicanos. Matosinhos: Quidnovi, Edição e Conteúdos, S. A. p. 127. ISBN 978-989-554-722-7.
- Lopes, Horacel (1956). O que vi em Portugal. Rio de Janeiro: Emp. Gráf. Ouvidor S. A. p. 341.
- Martins, Conceição; Barreto, António (1990). Memória do Vinho do Porto. Lisboa: Instituto de Ciências Sociais da Universidade de Lisboa. p. 508.
- Martins, João; Brion, Madalena; Sousa, Miguel; et al. (1996). O Caminho de Ferro Revisitado: O Caminho de Ferro em Portugal de 1856 a 1996. Lisboa: Caminhos de Ferro Portugueses. p. 446.
- Ortigão, Ramalho (1986). As Farpas: O País e a Sociedade Portuguesa. Vol. 1. Lisboa: Clássica Editora. p. 276.
- Reis, Francisco; Gomes, Rosa; Gomes, Gilberto; et al. (2006). Os Caminhos de Ferro Portugueses 1856-2006. Lisboa: CP-Comboios de Portugal e Público-Comunicação Social S. A. p. 238. ISBN 989-619-078-X.
- Joaquim, Serrão (1986). História de Portugal: O Terceiro Liberalismo (1851-1890). Verbo. p. 423.
- Viegas, Francisco (1988). Comboios Portugueses: Um Guia Sentimental. Lisboa: Círculo de Editores. p. 185.
