= Ferrão halt =

Halt in northern Portugal

Ferrão halt Apeadeiro de Ferrão
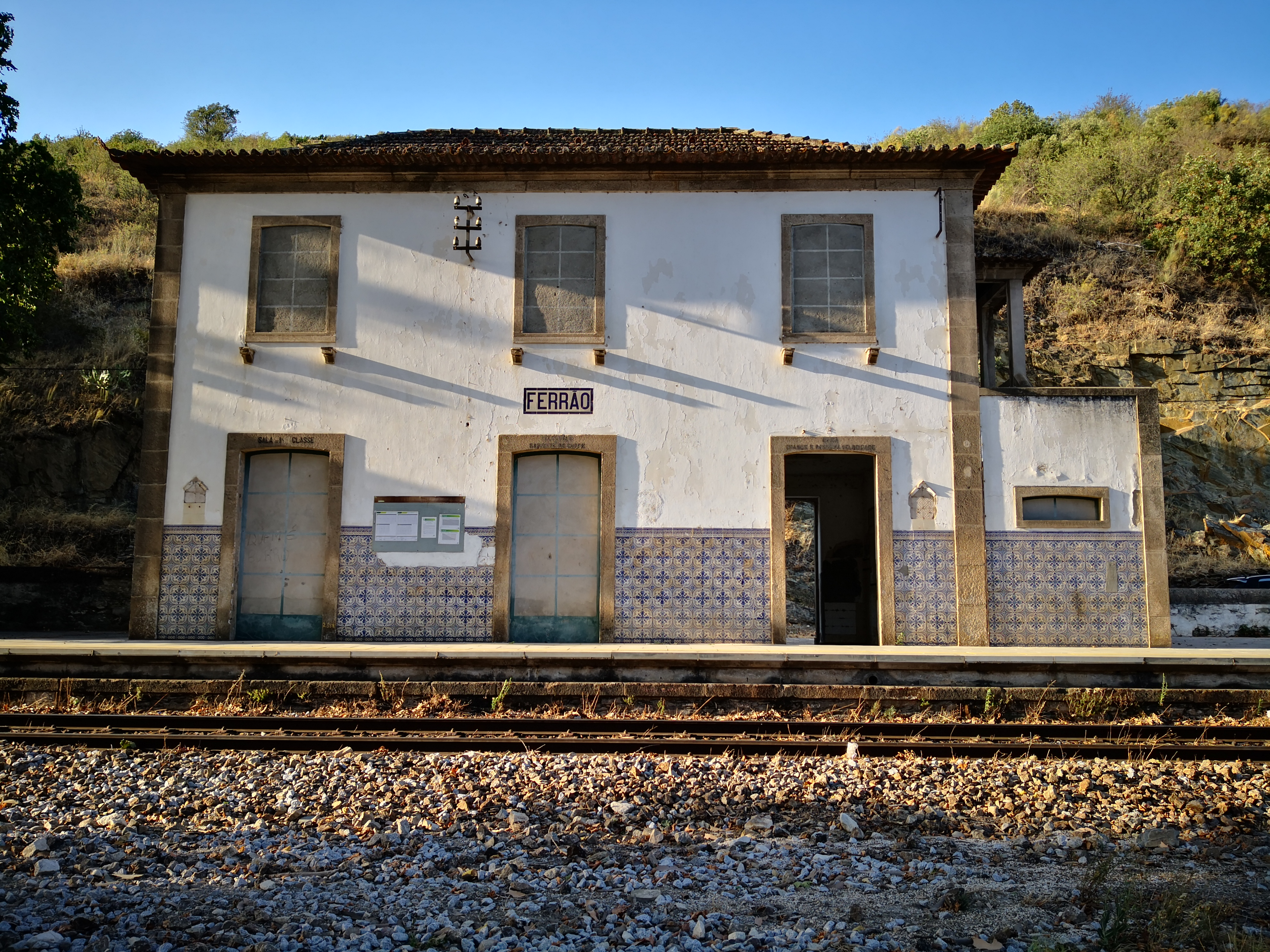
- Front of the Ferrão halt, 2019

General information
- Location: Sabrosa; Portugal
- Coordinates: 41.161956°N 7.610863°W
- Line: Douro line (1880-present)
- Tracks: 1
- Connections: Covelinhas railway station; Pinhão railway station

History
- Opened: 4 April 1880

Services
Preceding station	Comboios de Portugal	Following station
Covelinhas towards Porto-Campanhã	InterRegional	Pinhão towards Pocinho
Covelinhas towards Porto-São Bento	InterRegional	Pinhão towards Pocinho
Covelinhas towards Régua	Regional	Pinhão towards Pocinho
Covelinhas towards Porto-São Bento	InterRegional	Pinhão Terminus
Covelinhas towards Marco de Canaveses	Regional	Pinhão Terminus
Location
- Location within Portugal

The Ferrão halt is a halt on the Douro line that serves the town of Ferrão, in the municipality of Sabrosa, Portugal.

== History ==
This halt was inaugurated on 4 April 1880 as the provisional terminus of the Douro line, with the next section, to Pinhão, entering service on 1 June of the same year.

On 1 May 1903, the project for the extension of the passenger building at Ferrão station was completed, budgeted at 1:400$000 Réis, approved by an opinion of the Superior Council of Public Works of 14 May, and by a decree of the Ministry of Public Works, Commerce and Industry of 16 May.

In 1913, there was a stagecoach service from the Ferrão station to the town of Tabuaço.
