= Covelinhas =

Village and extinct parish in Portugal

- Civil parish
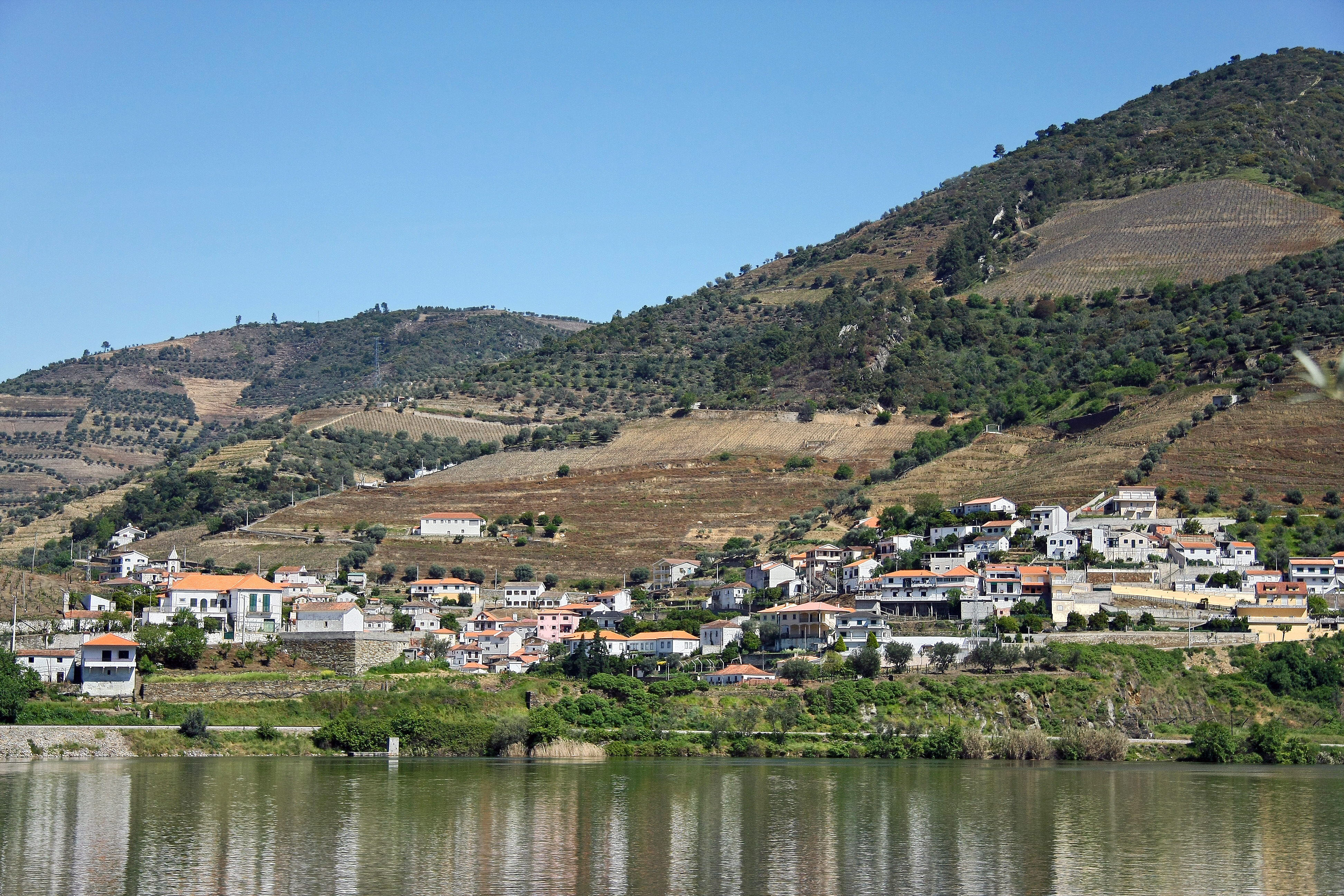
- Covelinhas in 2014

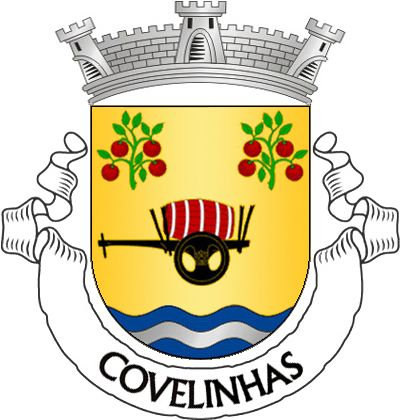
- Coat of arms

- Location in Portugal
- Coordinates: 41°9′33″N 7°40′59″W
- Country: Portugal
- Region: Norte
- Intermunic. comm.: Douro
- District: Vila Real
- Municipality: Peso da Régua

Area
  - Total: 4.31 km^{2} (1.66 sq mi)

Population (2011)
  - Total: 222
  - Density: 51.5/km^{2} (133/sq mi)
- Time zone: UTC+00:00 (WET)
  - Summer (DST): UTC+01:00 (WEST)

Covelinhas is an extinct Portuguese parish and village in the municipality of Peso da Régua in northern Portugal.

By the last administrative reorganization of the territory of the parishes, according to Law No. 11-A/2013 of January 28, this parish was extinct and merged with Galafura to form the Galafura and Covelinhas parish, with headquarters in Galafura.

== Access ==
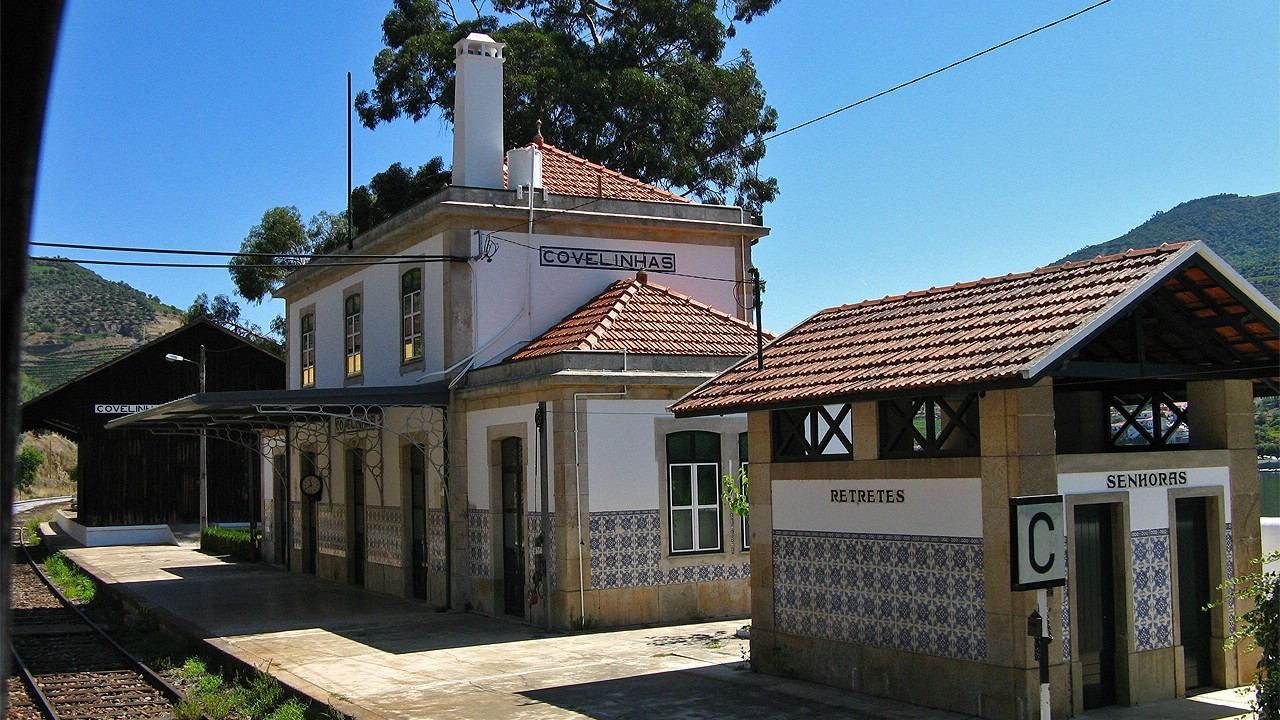
Covelinhas railway station in 2009

Covelinhas has the Covelinhas railway station, an interface in the Douro line.

== Population ==
Number of inhabitants

Year	Pop.	±%
1864	377	—
1878	427	+13.3%
1890	335	−21.5%
1900	446	+33.1%
1911	429	−3.8%
1920	425	−0.9%
1930	482	+13.4%
1940	567	+17.6%

Year	Pop.	±%
1950	546	−3.7%
1960	525	−3.8%
1970	503	−4.2%
1981	455	−9.5%
1991	436	−4.2%
2001	269	−38.3%
2011	222	−17.5%

Number of "resident" inhabitants, so only those who were officially resident in the municipality at the time of the census
