= São Bento railway station =

Railway station in Porto, Portugal

São Bento
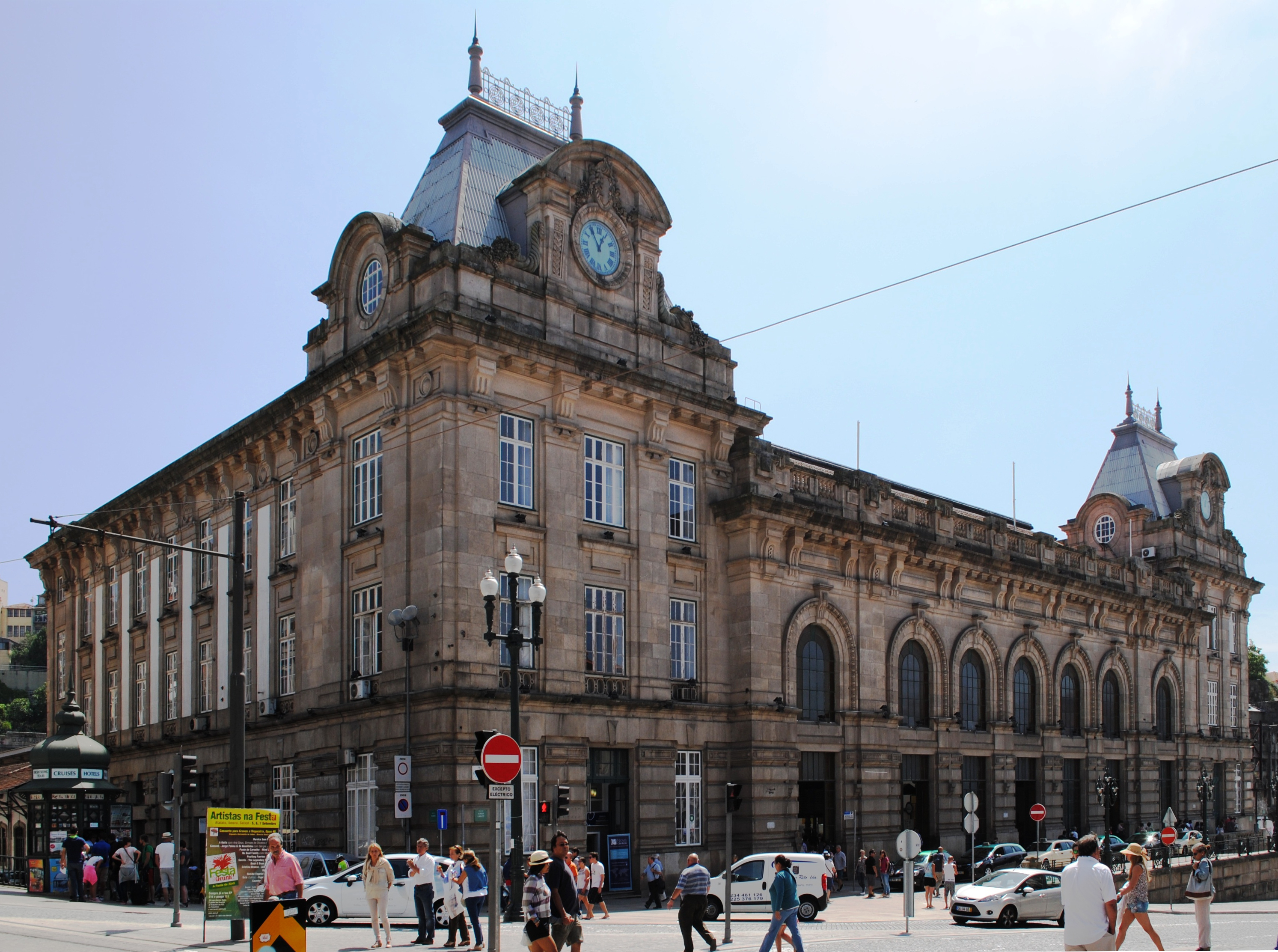
- The main facade of the São Bento railway station

General information
- Location: Cedofeita, Santo Ildefonso, Sé, Miragaia, São Nicolau e Vitória, Porto; Portugal
- Coordinates: 41°8′44″N 8°36′37.2″W
- Owner: Portuguese Republic

Construction
- Structure type: Ceramic
- Architect: José Marques da Silva
- Architectural style: French

History
- Opened: 1916

Services
Preceding station	Comboios de Portugal	Following station
Terminus	Regional	Porto-Campanhã toward Régua
Preceding station	CP Porto	Following station
Terminus	Linha do Marco	Porto-Campanhã toward Marco de Canaveses
Terminus	Linha de Guimarães	Porto-Campanhã toward Guimarães
Terminus	Linha de Braga	Porto-Campanhã toward Braga
Terminus	Linha de Aveiro	Porto-Campanhã toward Aveiro
Location

São Bento railway station (Portuguese: Estação ferroviária de São Bento) is a 20th-century railway terminal in the civil parish of Cedofeita, Santo Ildefonso, Sé, Miragaia, São Nicolau e Vitória, in the municipality of Porto, district of Porto. The English translation of São Bento is Saint Benedict. The station is located in the Historic Centre of Porto, which has been declared a UNESCO World Heritage Site and as a National Monument of Portugal.

This building was constructed over a number of years, starting in 1904, based on plans by architect José Marques da Silva. The large panels of around twenty thousand azulejo tiles (551 square meters) were designed and painted by Jorge Colaço. The murals represent moments in the country's history and the multicolored panels depict rural scenes showing the people of various regions.

The station is linked by an underground link to the São Bento station on line D of the Porto Metro.

== History ==
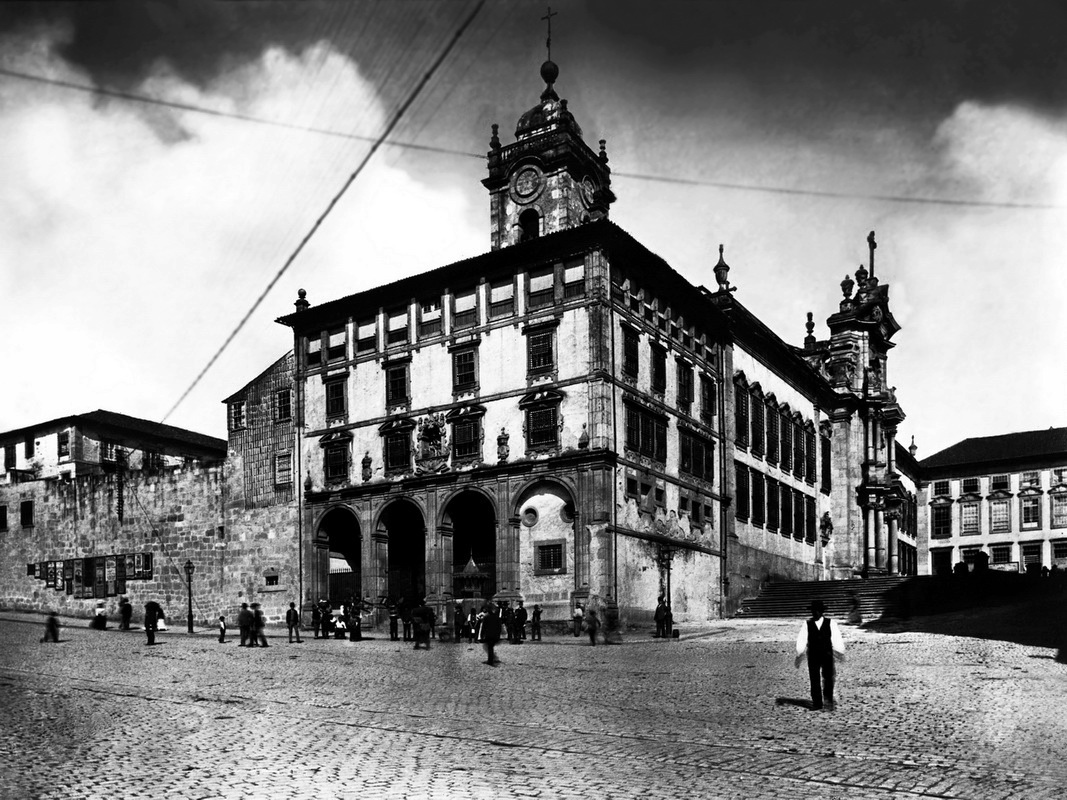
The Convent of São Bento da Avé Maria that was demolished in 1892; the station was later built on this site

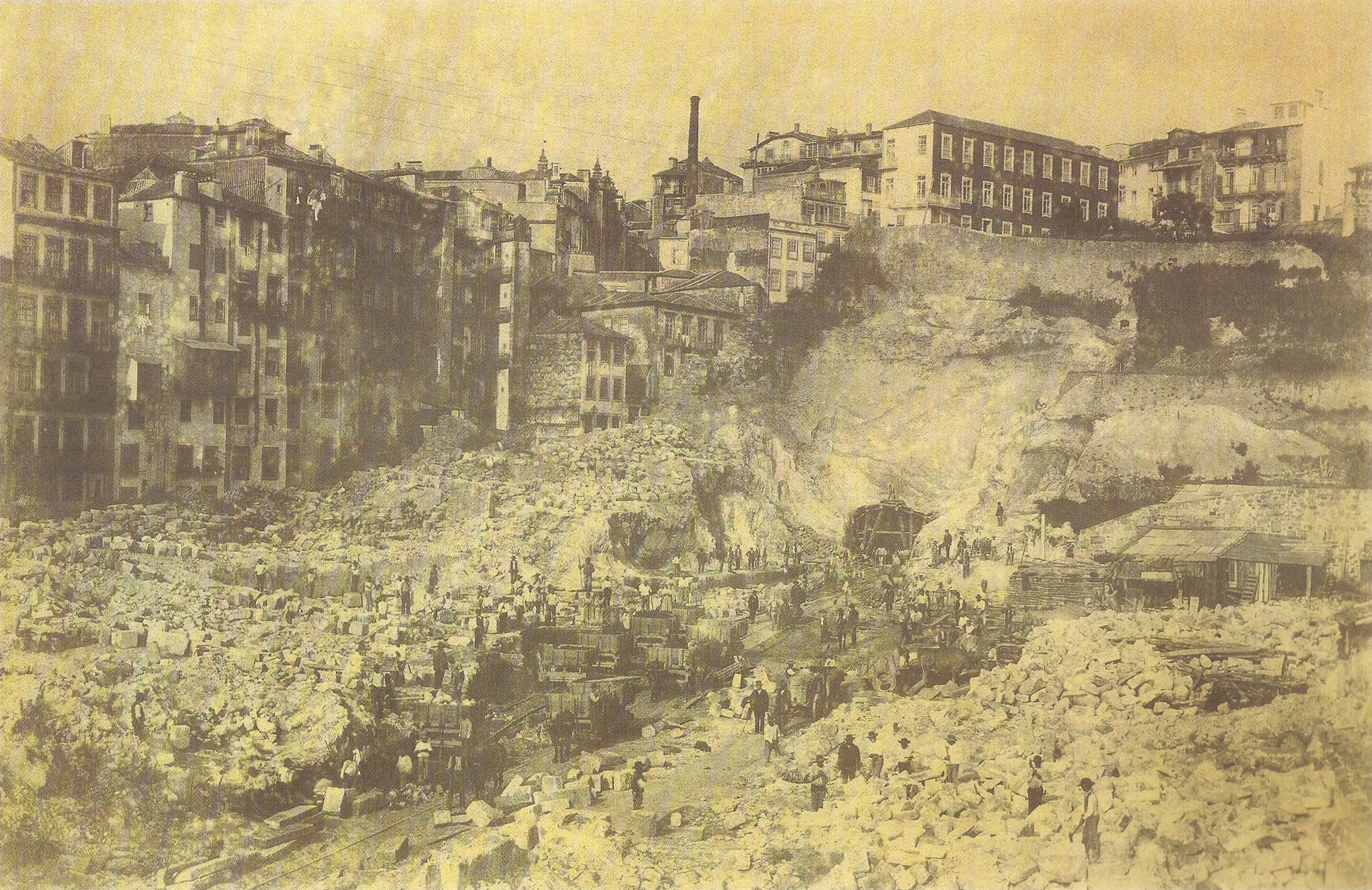
The excavation, urban decay and construction site at São Bento

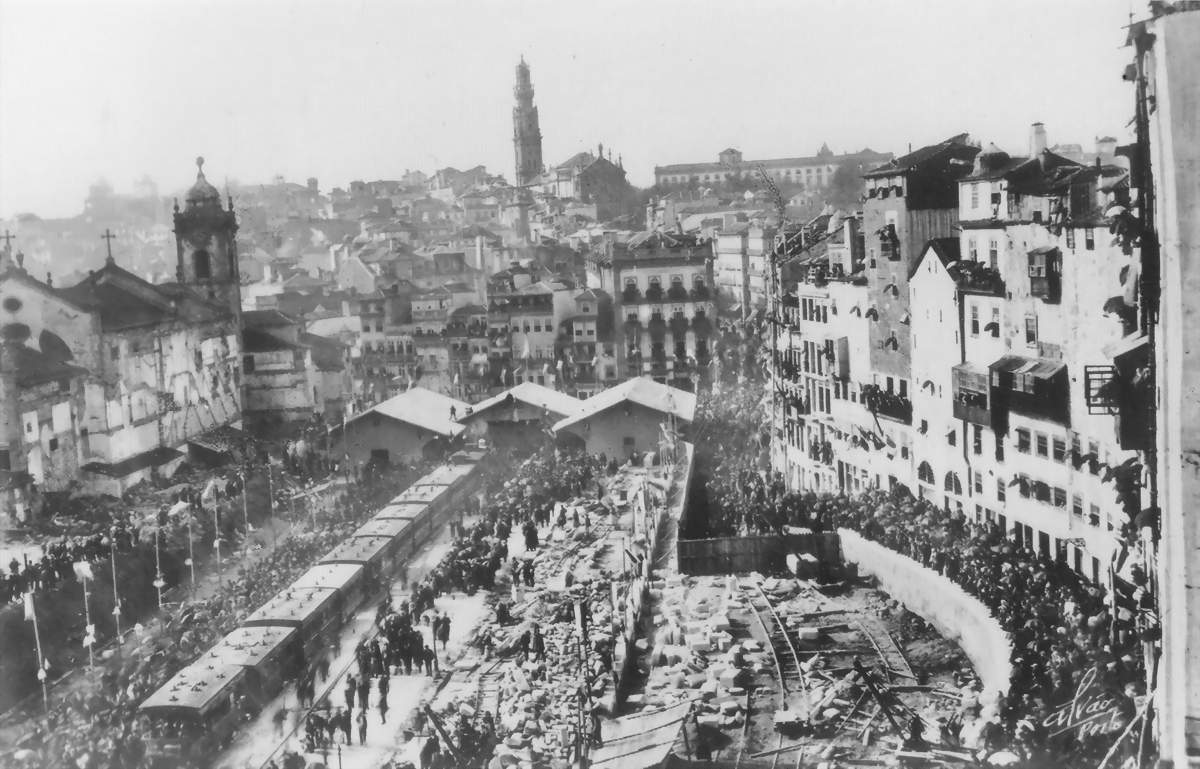
Dusk, as the first train arrives at the temporary São Bento station in 1896

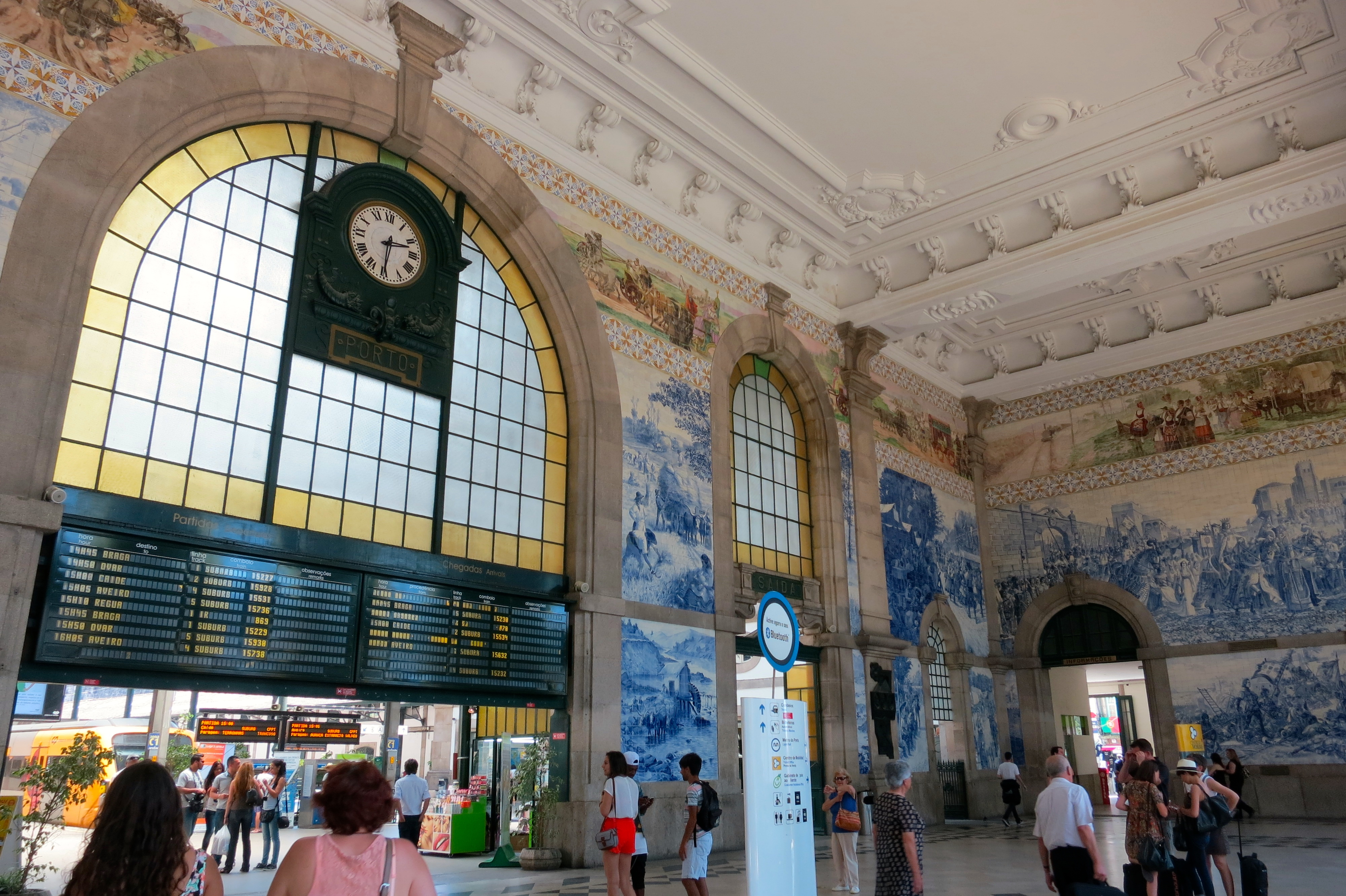
Interior of the completed station

As early as 1864, the Guia Histórico do Viajante do Porto e Arredores (Historic Guide for the Traveller to Porto and Surroundings) implied the intention to construct a central station to be located in the Palacette of the Quinta do Cirne (Campo 24 de Agosto).

In 1887, José Maria Ferreira and António Júlio Machado, aldermen, presented to the municipal council a project for a Central Station in Porto, elaborated by Hippolyte de Bare. The following year, Emídio Navarro, Minister of Public Works, authorised the construction of a railway line between Campanhã and a central station to be built near Praça de D. Pedro.

It was finally decided to build the station on the site of the Benedictine Convent of São Bento da Avé Maria, which had been ordered built by King Manuel I of Portugal in 1518. The building had been a monastery until it was destroyed by fire in 1783 and was later rebuilt for use as a convent. It was in a state of disrepair by 1892 when the last nun died and was demolished that year.

By 1890, work on the tunnel was already underway and was completed in 1893. The first train arrived at this location (before the current building was constructed) in 1896. But, in 1897, there was a landslide at the opening of the tunnel on the southern edge of the station. The preliminary work on a planned station along the angle of Praça Almeida Garret and Rua da Madeira began in 1900. The cornerstone was placed by King D. Carlos I.

The design/build project was entrusted to Porto architect José Marques da Silva, whose design was influenced by French Beaux-Arts architecture. He showed the drawings of a first concept to the authorities in May 1897 and received a contract in September 1899, with full payment. He revised the concept several times during discussions with the Public Works staff at City Hall before settling on the final design, a U shape facing the Praça Almeida Garrett (Almeida Garrett Square). In 1901, the administrative commission for the railway expanded the concept to also include a postal station.

The project was approved in 1903, and construction of the actual station building started the following year. The city was not satisfied with the work over the years and removed da Silva from the project in 1909. Various delays led to the total project (structure and interior decor) consuming 13 years.

In September 1988, a plan was authorised to heritage list the property. The first steps to renovate the site began in 1992, with work on the facades and restoration of the boxes and ceiling; this included work on the interior and exterior illumination.

In October 2016, Porto Vivo-Sociedade de Reabilitação Urbana ordered that public work in constructing a hostel on the lateral facade of the station should be stopped until an official application for a license was obtained. The company responsible for the installation was F2IS - Consultadora e Gestão de Projectos, which finally submitted an application on 17 October. The work was completed and the business operates as "The Passenger Hostel".

== Architecture ==
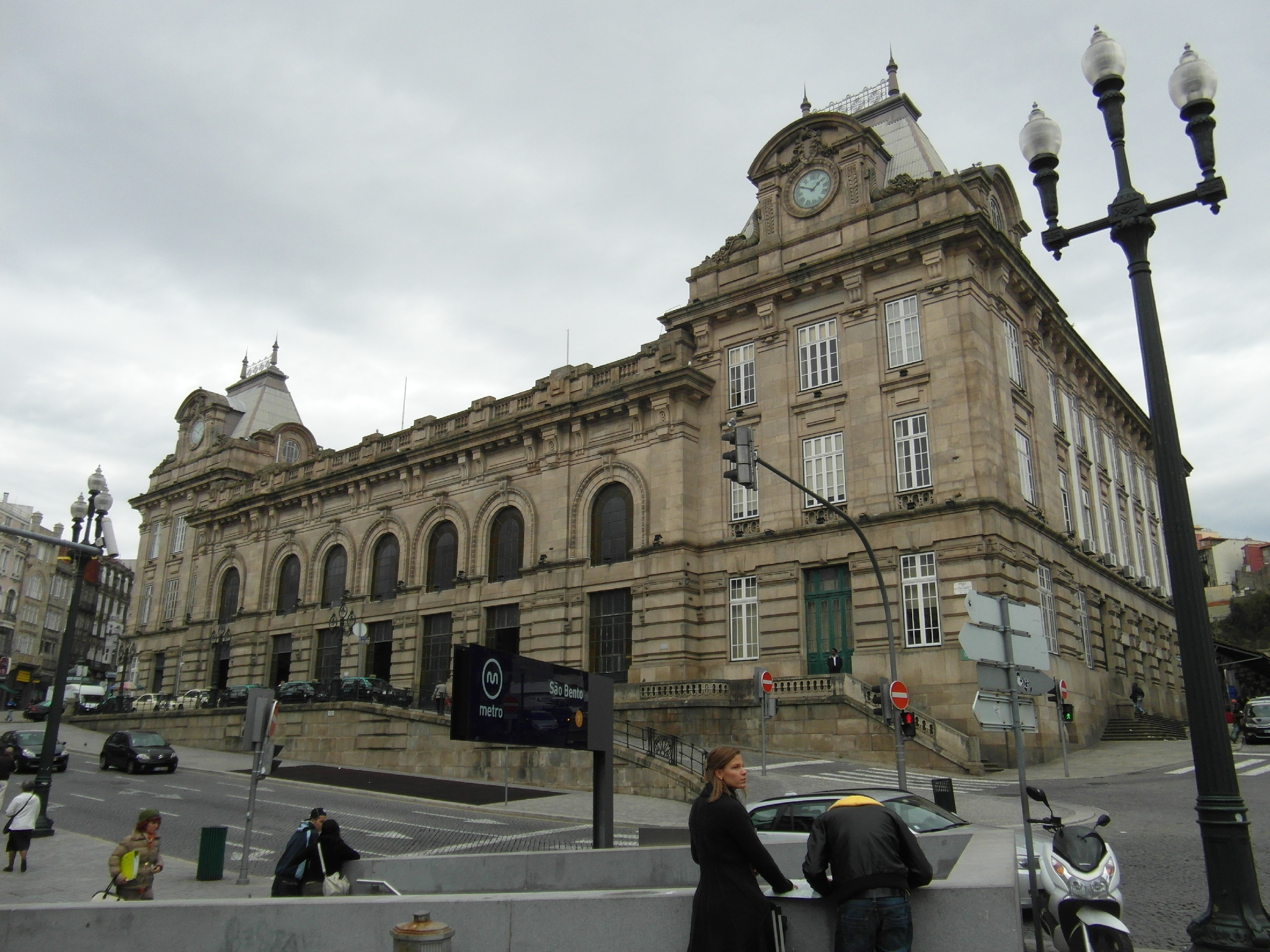
The massive symmetrical facade and principal entrance to the railway station

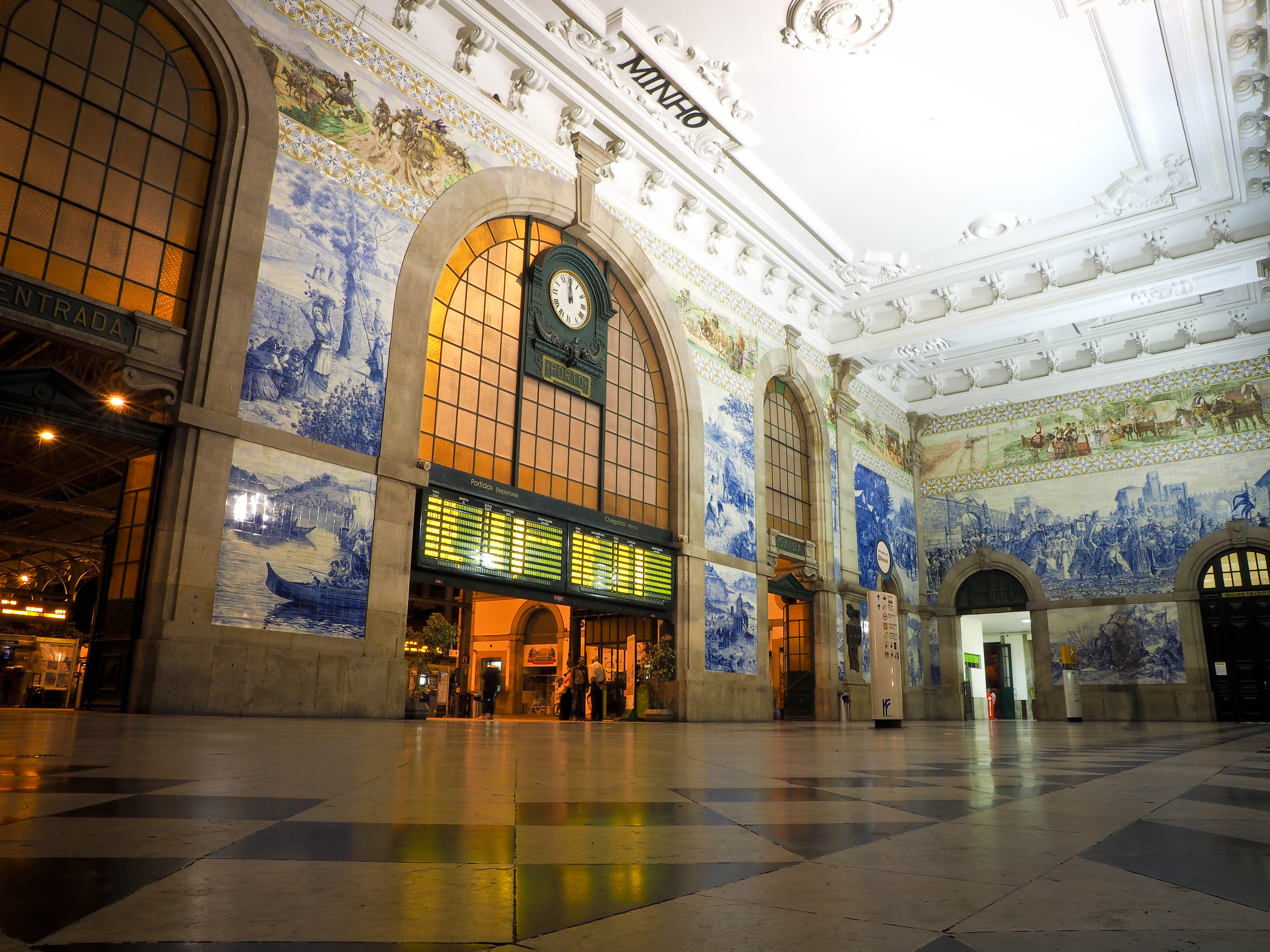
Azulejo panel in the São Bento Railway Station

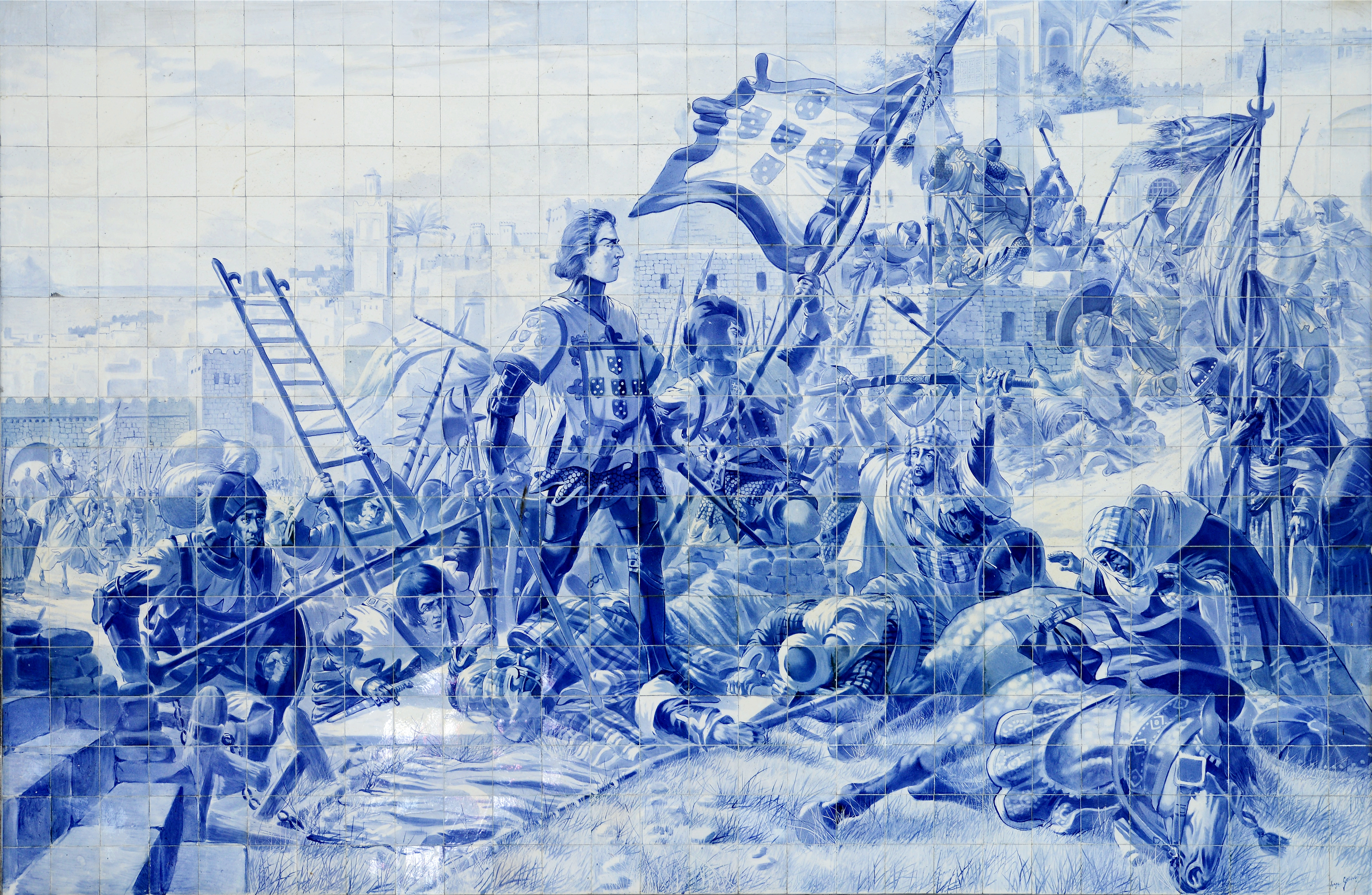
Depiction of Prince Henry the Navigator in the conquest of Septa, by Jorge Colaço

The station is located in the historic centre, occupying a large space delimited by the Praça Almeida Garrett, Rua da Madeira and Rua do Loureiro, as well as the escarpment of Batalha, where a tunnel has been carved into the hill.

The symmetrical, three-story, granite building has a U-shaped plan, with its principal facade oriented to the southwest. A building of geometric rigor, in the Beaux-Arts style that was particularly popular in France, it has a central body corresponding to the principal atrium and on either extreme two volumes. The central body has strong architrave cornice over corbels, with dense repetitive rhythm that covers the whole building. Rounding the facade is a robust frame with similar fenestrations, while the lateral facades maintain a relation between span symmetry, content and decoration.

The vestibule is covered in azulejo tile, framed by pilasters. Near the ceiling is a blue and gold frieze decorated with stylized flowers, while below them is another polychromatic frieze depicting the history of transportation in Portugal. Below the friezes are large azulejo "paintings" representing historical events in Portuguese history. The tin-glazed azulejo tiles are integrated into the architecture by frames in granite which decorate the lines of the atrium.

=== Vestibule and historic tile images ===
There are approximately 20,000 azulejo tiles, dating from 1905–1916, that were composed by Jorge Colaço, an important painter of azulejo. The actual tiles were made in the Sacavém factory. Colaço placed the first tiles on 13 August 1905. To the left of the entrance is a scene depicting the Battle of Arcos de Valdevez and Egas Moniz before Alfonso VII of Castile, while to the right, is D. João I in Oporto, with his fiancée (with an unfortunate mechanical crossing through the middle of the picture), and the Conquest of Ceuta. On the border wall at the entrance are small panels depicting countryside scenes. The tile project required 11 years to complete.

The upper parts of the frieze are lined with polychromatic (multicolored) azulejos depicting a chronology of some forms of transport used by people in various areas of Portugal. The lower and upper frame of the frieze consists of a line of tile in blue, browns and yellow in a stylized geometric pattern.

Under this, on the top of the north wall, is a large composition that covers the entire wall, depicting the Battle of Valdevez (1140), with two groups of antagonists and other knights in the background. This monochromatic composition, like the other main azulejo scenes, is executed in blue on white tile.

Below it is another composition that represents meeting between the knight Egas Moniz and Alfonso VII of León in Toledo (12th century), offering his life, his wife and his sons following the siege of Guimarães. In the south, is a painting of the entrance to Porto of King John I and Philippa of Lancaster, on horseback, to celebrate their wedding (1387). Below that is the conquest of Ceuta (1415), with the principal figure of Infante D. Henrique, who subjugated the Moors.

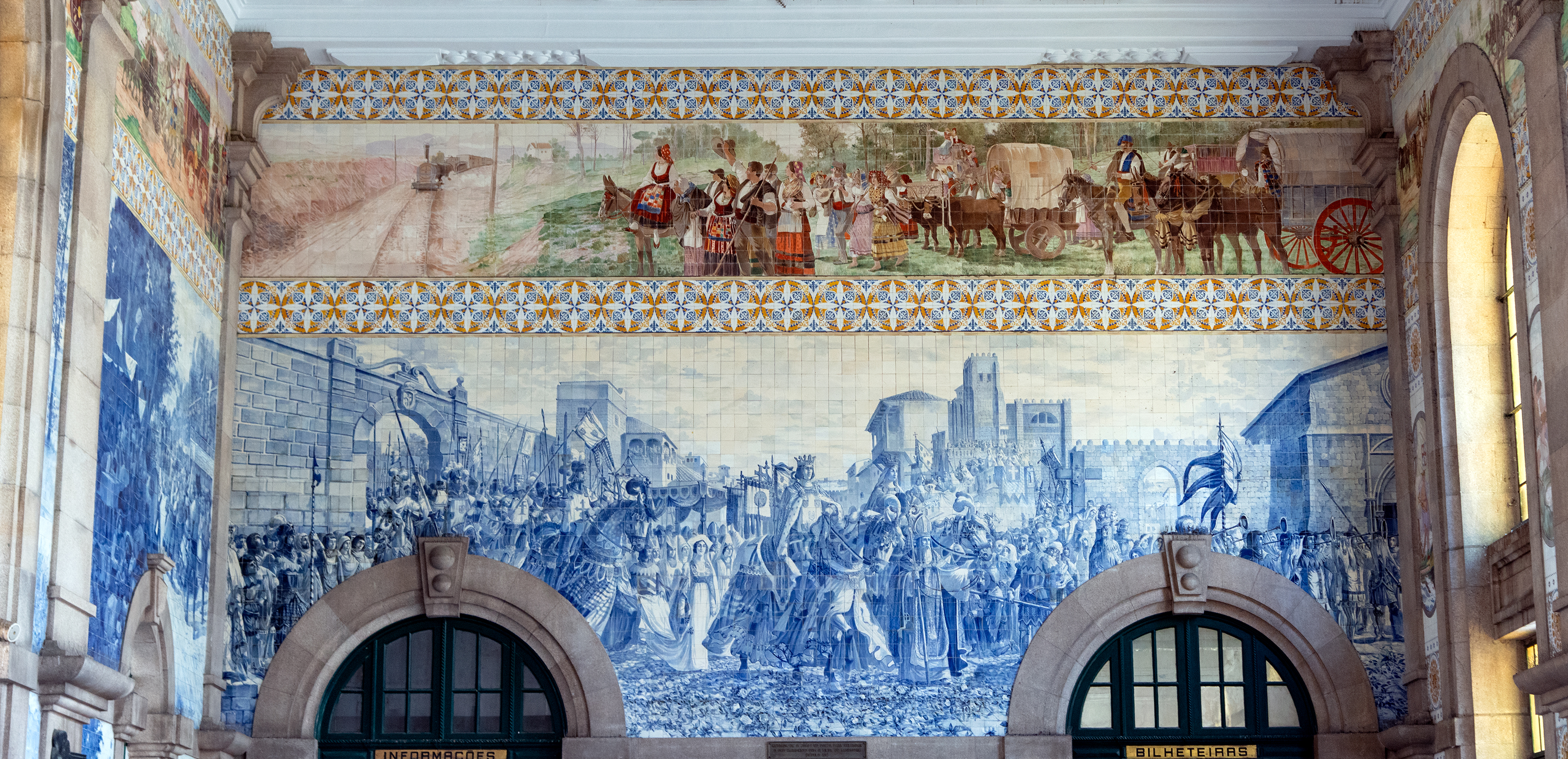
Blue azuelo tile mural and polychromatic tile mural

The wall into the station is divided into multiple compositions. To the left, a vision of the procession of Nossa Senhora dos Remédios in Lamego, an exhaustive description and detail showing the multitudes within an urban setting. Under this composition are two panels that represent her "promise" on her knees and, the other, her actions at the "miraculous" fountain. In the same detail is the pilgrimage of São Trocato to Guimarães.

One of the lower panels show a picture of a cattle fair and pilgrim camp. The central panels of the wall represent four work scenes: the vineyards, the harvest, the wine shipment down the Douro and work in the watermill. On the pilasters separating the doors with access to the street, below the polychromatic frieze, is a series of smaller compositions. Above these are medallions depicting romantic scenes and, below, allegories associated with the railway referencing time and signalling, in an Art Deco style.

== Services ==
São Bento is the main terminus of Porto's suburban railways lines and western terminus for the scenic Douro line between Porto and Pocinho. The station for trains arriving from Lisbon is the Campanhã (the national railway station) but there is subsequent service to São Bento via a local train.

The station also serves the Minho, Braga, Guimarães, Caíde/ Marco de Canaveses and Aveiro lines. All trains leaving São Bento call at Campanhã station as their first stop.

The station is on the Porto metro Line D (Yellow) with the first station south over the River Douro being Jardim do Morro and the first station north, Aliados.

The station is near vintage tram line 22 and is connected to São Bento Metro Station on Metro line D.

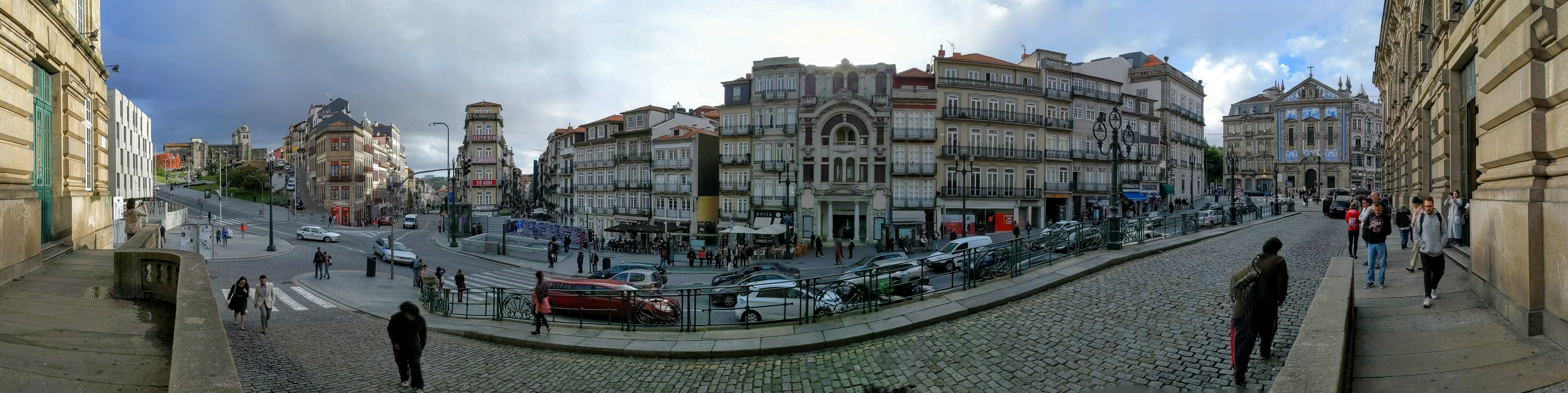
Panoramic view of the neighborhood from the station front entrance

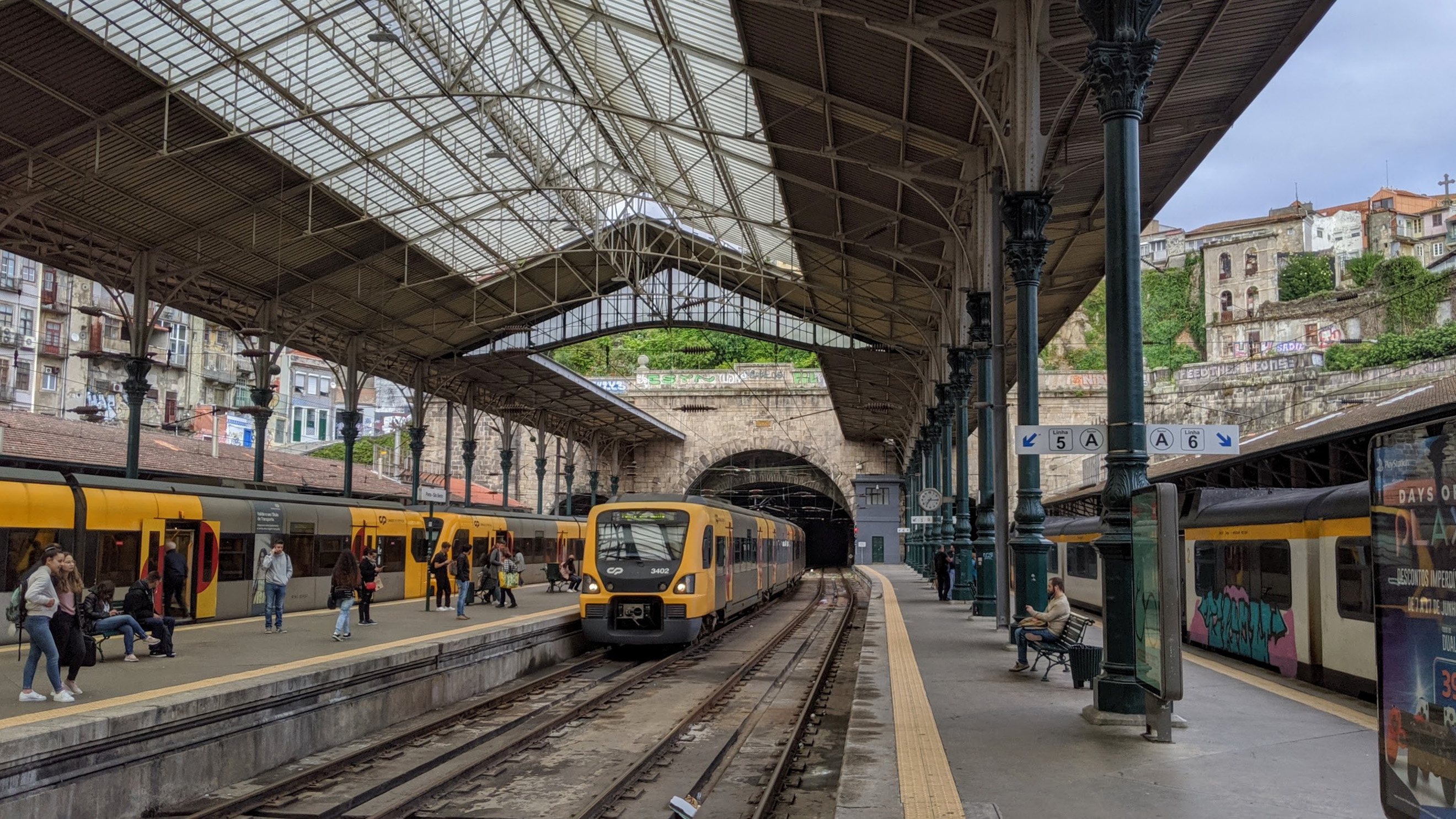
View east along São Bento railway station platforms

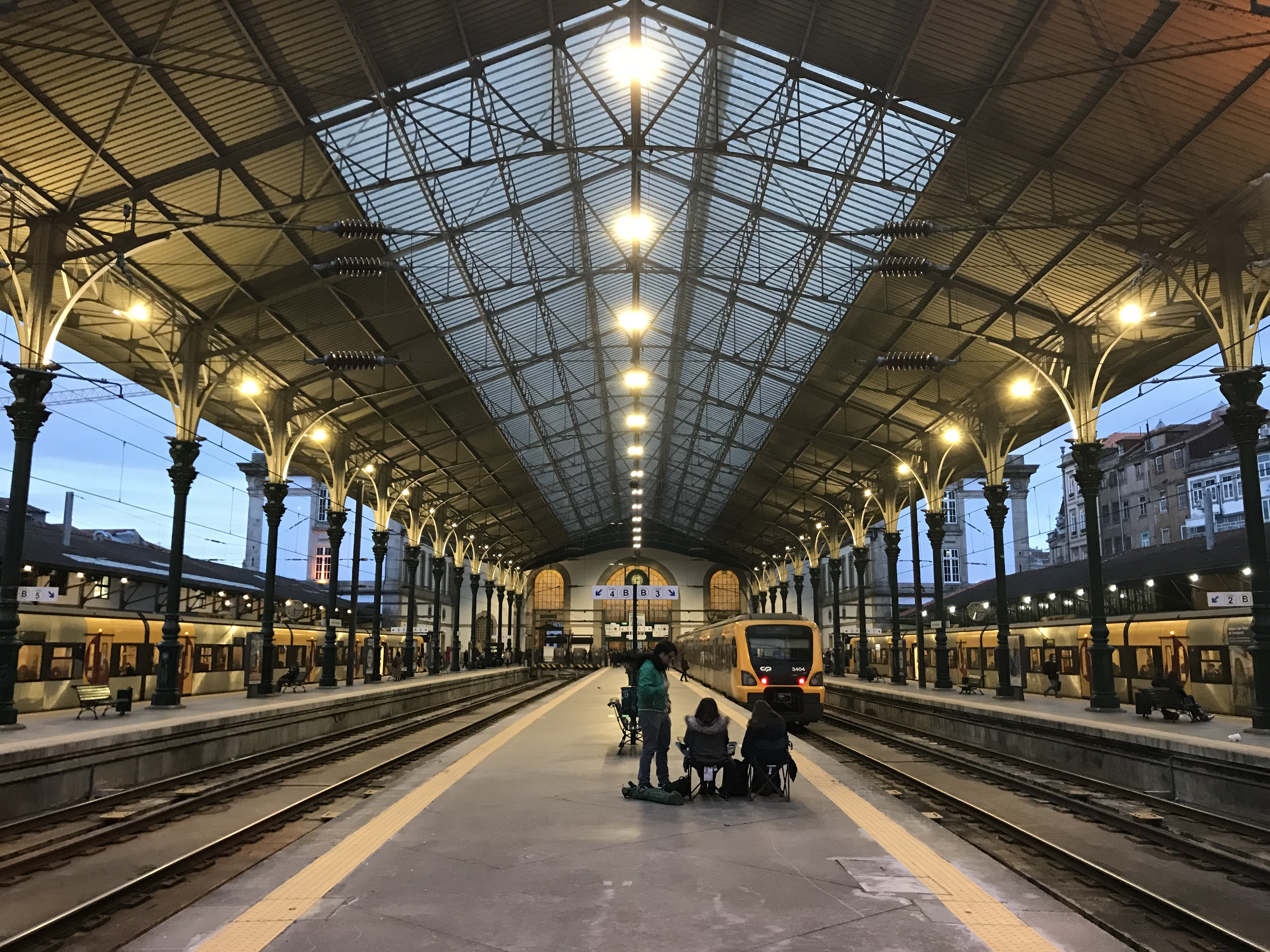
View west along São Bento railway station platforms
