= Pinhão railway station =

Railway station in Portugal

Pinhão
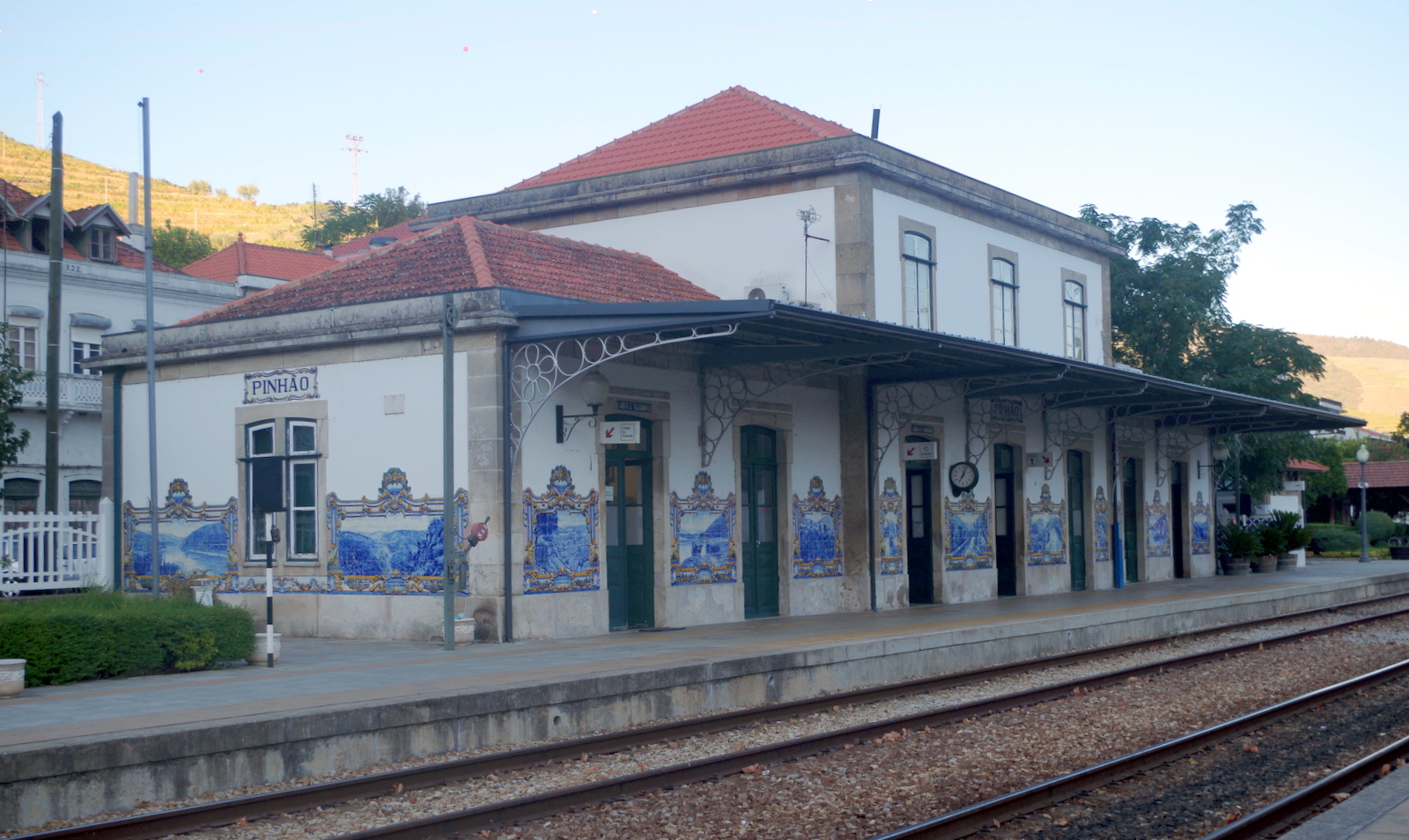

General information
- Location: Alijó, Portugal
- Coordinates: 41°11′26″N 7°32′42″W
- Line: Douro line (1880-present),
- Tracks: 2

History
- Opened: 1 June 1880

Services
Preceding station	Comboios de Portugal	Following station
Location
- Location within Portugal

Pinhão railway station is a station on the Douro Line, in the north of Portugal. It serves the parish of Pinhão, in the municipality of Alijó, in the Vila Real District. The station is a tourist attraction, particularly notable for its azulejo tiles.

== History ==
A law of 2 July 1867 authorised the government to build and operate a railway between the city of Porto and Pinhão. A decree of 14 June 1872 ordered studies to be carried out for the route of line, which was to initially follow the course of the Sousa River, passing through Penafiel before following the northern bank of the Douro. The railway reached Pinhão in 1879, but the section between Ferrão halt and Pinhão only entered into service on 1 June 1880. In 1881, construction began on the next section, to Tua railway station, which entered service on 1 September 1883. In 1901, the board of directors of Portuguese State Railways ordered a study to be carried out on the road connections to its stations and halts on the Douro Line. This, combined with the new metal road bridge across the Douro at Pinhão, led to improved access to the station.

Major repair work was carried out in 1936, including the installation of electric light, and further repair work was done in 1992. After a proposal by the then president of the Pinhão Parish Council, António Manuel Saraiva, to decorate the station with azulejo tiles, which had been turned down by the railway company, in 1935, the Instituto dos Vinhos do Douro e Porto (Port Wine Institute) donated tiles to cover the station, both at the front and along the platform. Created in 1933, the institute's objectives were to promote and defend the Port wine brand nationally and internationally and to advertise the sector. It considered that the installation of the azulejo panels at Pinhão would contribute to the town's promotion as being the "heart of the Douro". Designed and painted by João Marques Oliveira and Lourenço Rodrigues Limas, on the basis of photographs produced by the photography company, Casa Alvão, with the final selection being made by the railway company, they were produced by the Aleluia Factory in Aveiro, and were installed in 1937 after the repair work had been completed.

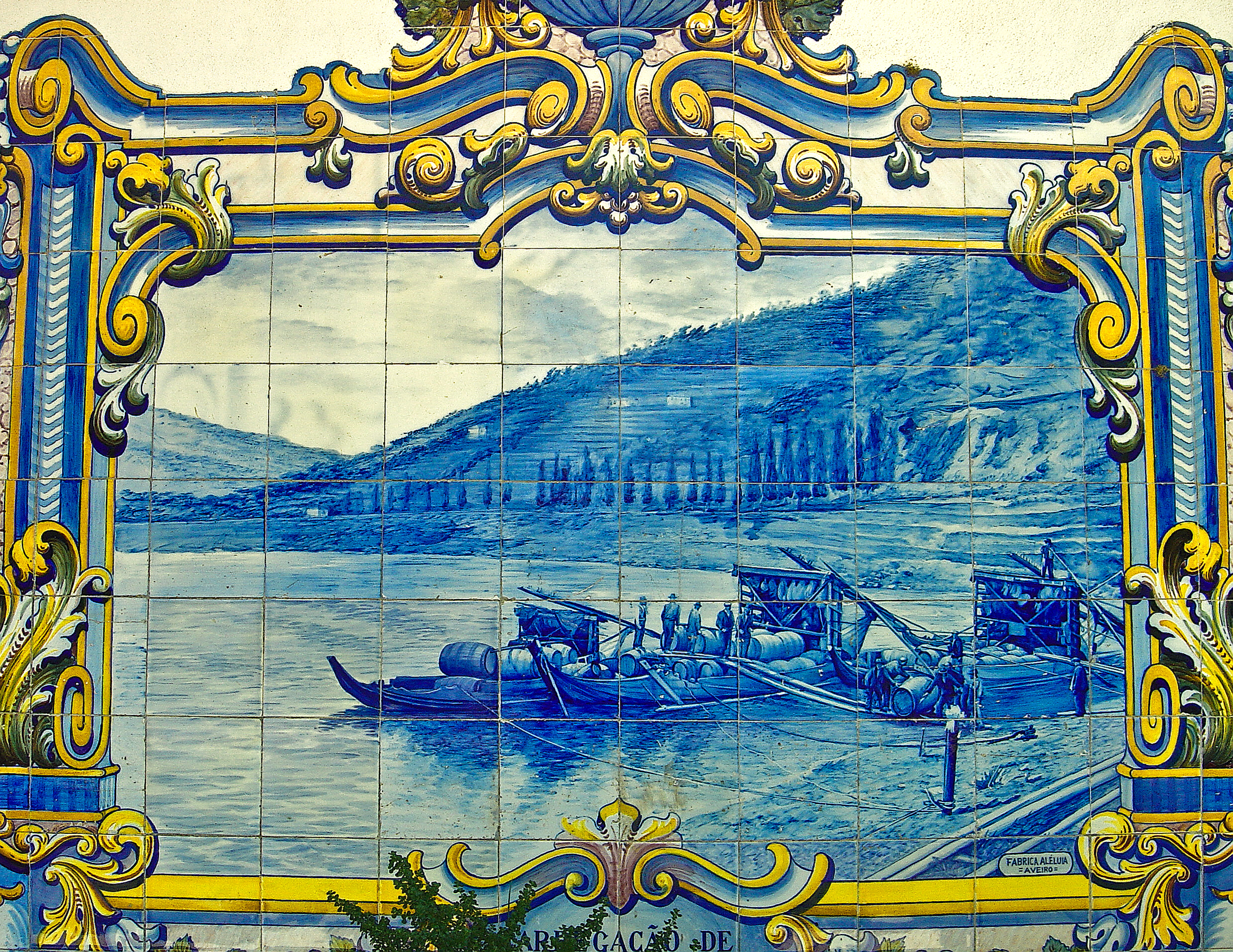
Azulejo panel showing transport of wine on the Douro

== The station ==
Pinhão station has two platforms, which are 145 metres and 198 metres long. The rectangular passenger building is located on the north side of the tracks. The central section has two floors, and the side sections each have one floor. The façades are rendered and painted white, with a stone base, pilastered corners and frieze finishes. A metal canopy extends forward over the passenger platform. The station is now completely decorated by the tiles, which depict landscapes and traditional activities of the region, especially the cultivation of vines, the treading of the grapes, and the transport of the wine in rabelo boats down the river to the cellars in Vila Nova de Gaia. This theme was directly related to the station, which established itself as one of the main depots for the transport of wine in the Douro region. The 24 tile panels are made up of more than 3000 tiles.

Pinhão station won the SOS Azulejo Conservation and Restoration Intervention Award in 2013 for its contribution to the enhancement of Portuguese heritage through the rehabilitation of the tile panels. In addition to the tiles, the station garden was also an attraction, winning several awards.

== Services ==
The station is served by regional and inter-regional trains operated by Comboios de Portugal.
