= Portugues =

Portugues and variants may refer to:

- Portugués, Adjuntas, Puerto Rico, a barrio
- Portugués Rural or just Portugués, one of the 31 barrios in the municipality of Ponce, Puerto Rico
- Portugués Urbano, one of the 31 barrios in the municipality of Ponce, Puerto Rico
- Portugués River in Puerto Rico
  - Portugués Dam
- Português (cigarette)
- Português (coin), gold coin
- Bartolomeu Português, Portuguese buccaneer who attacked Spanish shipping in the late 1660s
- Deportivo Portugués, Venezuelan football club
- The Portuguese language name for something of, from, or related to Portugal, the Portuguese language and Portuguese people

== See also ==
- Portuguese (disambiguation)
