= Rogério de Azevedo =

Portuguese architect

Rogério dos Santos de Azevedo
- Rogério dos Santos de Azevedo, date unknown
- Born: June 25, 1898; Porto, Portugal
- Died: September 24, 1983 (aged 85); Porto, Portugal
- Education: Escola de Belas-Artes do Porto
- Occupation: Architect
- Buildings: O Comércio do Porto offices; O Comércio do Porto garage

Rogério dos Santos de Azevedo (Cedofeita, Porto, 25 June 1898 – Foz do Douro, Porto, 24 September 1983) was a Portuguese architect.

He practiced during the first half of the twentieth century, a period during which Portuguese architecture increasingly embraced the principles and various strands of modernism—of which he was one of the major pioneers—a period which was nonetheless also marked by traditionalism through the political association with the corporatism of Estado Novo. This also conditioned much of his work from the 1930s onwards.

== Life and Work ==
Rogério dos Santos de Azevedo was the son of the merchant José Joaquim de Azevedo and his wife Carolina Auta de Azevedo, a homemaker, both of whom were from Porto (he from the parish of Porto's cathedral (Sé) and she from the parish of Miragaia).

When he was 5 years old, his father died, and he became a boarding student at the Porto Orphanage, where he began training for a career in the clergy. When he was 14, however, he entered the Porto School of Fine Arts, now the Faculty of Fine Arts of the University of Porto, where he studied for six years, then re-enrolled in 1920 and graduated in 1926. He eventually interned with the well-known Porto architect José Marques da Silva, who exerted a profound influence on Azevedo's development as a designer. Between 1925 and 1932 he taught construction drawing, projection, and technology at the high school level (known as "technical" education) in Porto and Viseu.

He wed Albertina Pereira Ferreira Mendes in Porto in a civil ceremony on March 21, 1928; they remained married until her death on October 1, 1979.

Beginning in the mid-1930s, Azevedo rose to prominent positions locally and nationally in both government and institutional circles. From 1935 to 1938, he served as a member of the Aesthetics Committee of the Porto Alegre city council, and helmed the Porto section of the General Directorate of National Buildings and Monuments between 1936 and 1940. From 1940 to 1968 he served as a professor at the Porto School of Fine Arts, becoming chair of Architectural Drawing, Construction and Building Health. He also served as a city councilor in Porto from 1955 to 1960.

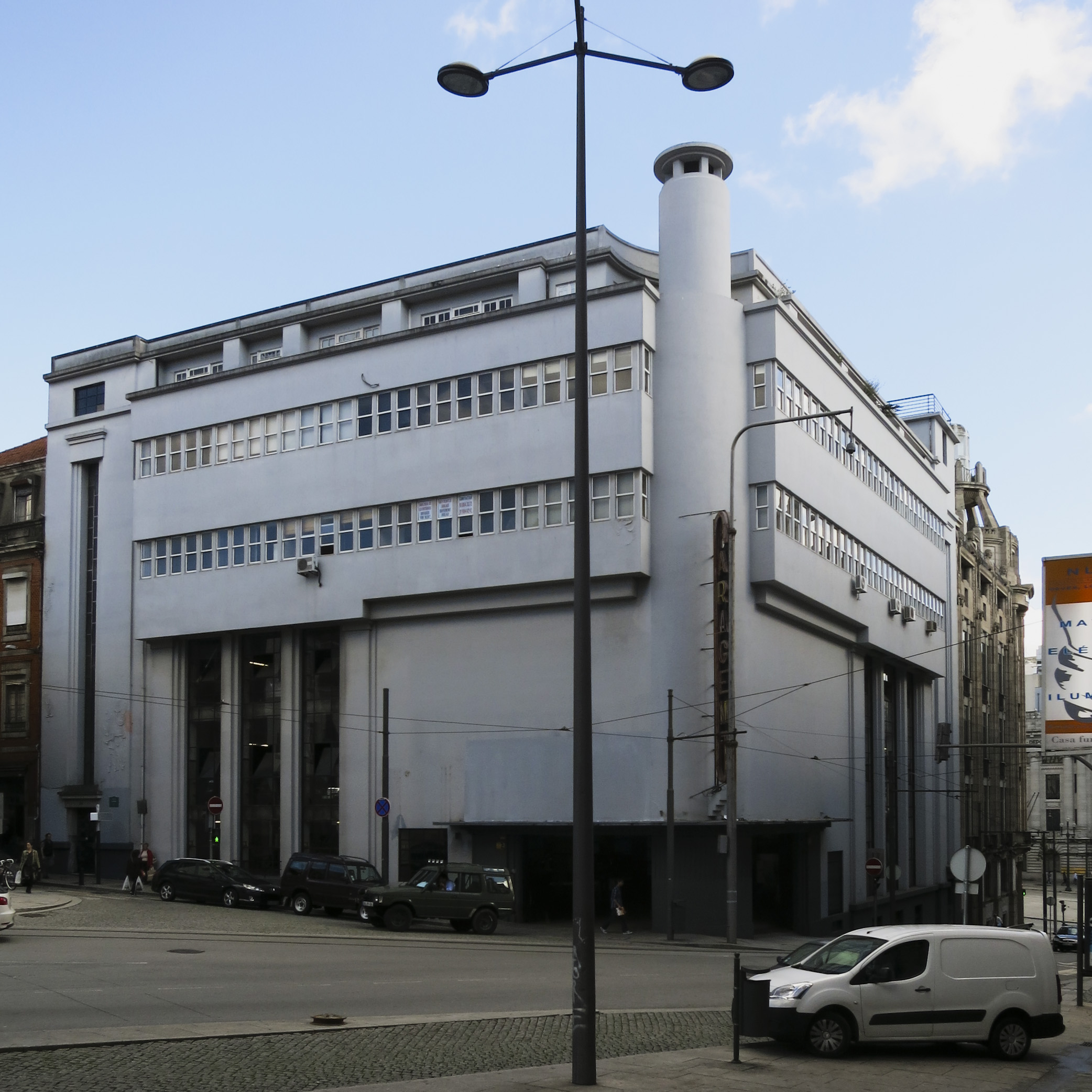
Garage of the newspaper O Comércio do Porto, by Rogério dos Santos de Azevedo, 1928–32. The newspaper's headquarters, also designed by Azevedo, is visible to the rear.

Azevedo shared a studio and collaborated with Baltazar Castro during the early years of his career. His most notable works are the pair of structures for the newspaper O Comércio do Porto: their headquarters (1930–33) on the grand Avenida dos Aliados in central Porto, and their garage abutting it to the rear (built 1928–32). While the newspaper headquarters is an essay in the lavish decoration of Art Déco, the garage is an even more striking example of the streamlined austerity of Art Moderne using the rationalism of naked concrete and features common to the International Style, such as ribbon windows on the upper levels.

However, due to the prevailing political climate of the Estado Novo, Azevedo and other Portuguese architects were constrained by an unofficial state preference for more traditional architectural aesthetic. As a result, his other works do not betray the bold austerity of the Comércio do Porto garage, which is more of an anomaly. Even private clients felt constrained by the government's reticence towards modernism, and the resulting Português Suave or "Soft Portuguese" style characterized much of the country's built environment dating from the middle of the twentieth century. Its historicist forms were directly associated with the standardization, for example, of school buildings under the Plano dos Centenários (Plan of the Centennials), begun in 1944, which constituted a regionalist model of architectural practice, attuned to differences in climate, material resources, and processes of construction; but in accordance with pedagogical and hygienic criteria set by the government. Azevedo completed several school buildings under this system in northern Portugal. He also was responsible for designing three of the first Pousadas de Portugal, an (originally) government-owned and run chain of luxury hotels established in 1941, but now privatized.

Not the least because of his own teaching, Azevedo was a significant influence on later Portuguese architects, particularly those who worked directly for him, such as Viana de Lima, Arménio Losa and Januário Godinho. He died on 24 September 1983 in the parish of Foz do Douro, in Porto.

== List of selected works ==
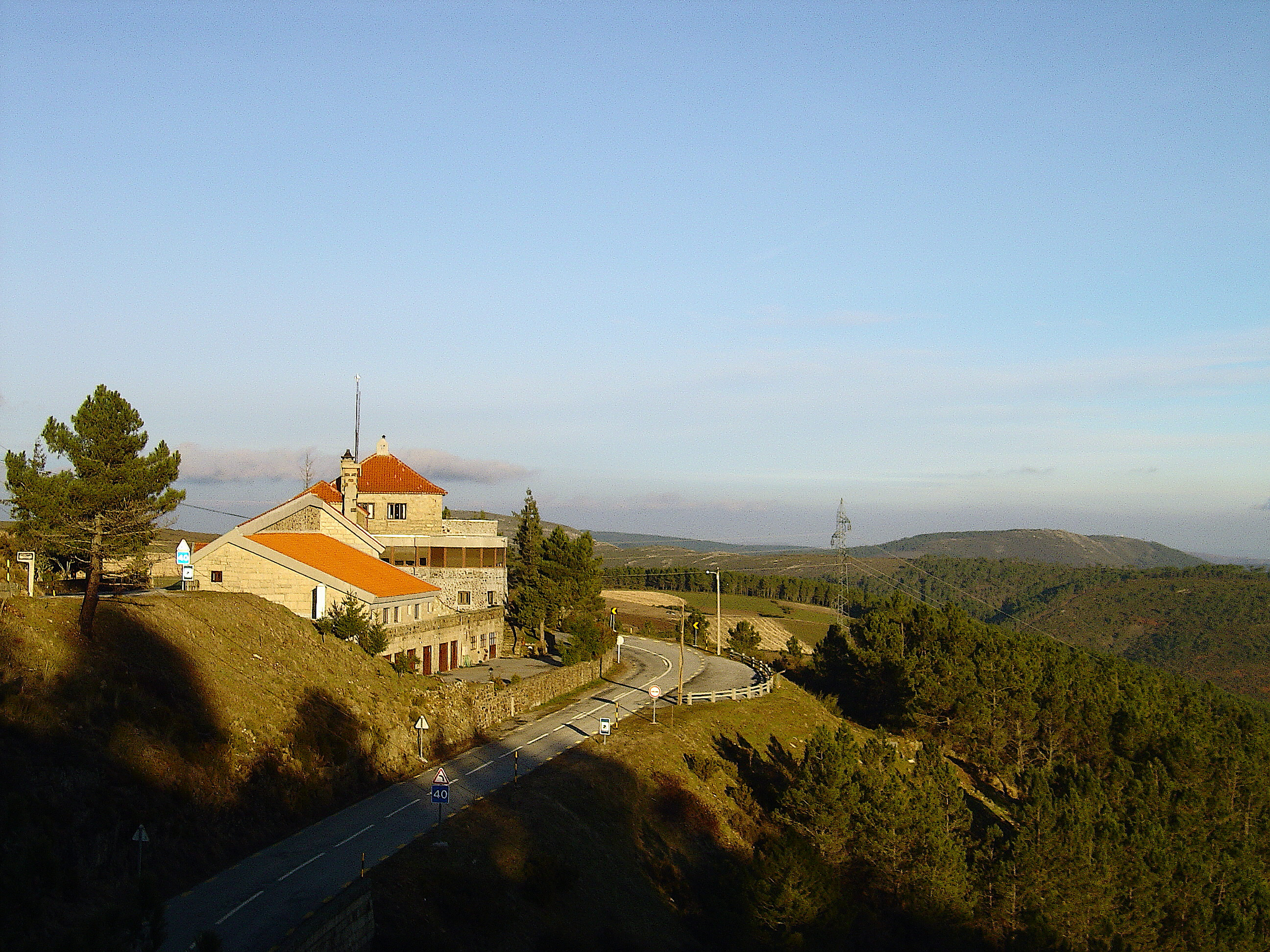
Pousada de São Lourenço, Serra da Estrela, Portugal, by Rogério de Azevedo, 1942–48.

- 1930 – Post Office, Viana do Castelo
- 1928–32 – Parking Garage of the newspaper O Comércio do Porto, Porto
- 1930–33 – O Comércio do Porto Headquarters (currently BANIF), Avenida dos Aliados, Porto
- 1934 – Buildings on Rua D. João IV, Porto
- 1935 – Former building of the Faculty of Medicine of the University of Porto, Largo da Escola Médica, Porto
- 1936 – Viana do Castelo Court
- 1936–40 – Study and reconstruction-integration of the Ducal Palace of Guimarães
- 1941 – Rialto Building, Porto
- 1942–48 – Pousada de S. Gonçalo, Marão
- 1942–48 – Pousada de Santo António de Serém, Águeda
- 1942–48 – Pousada de S. Lourenço, Serra da Estrela
- 1942 – School and Chapel of the Martim Rei Agricultural Colony, Sabugal
- 1945 – Hotel Infante Sagres, Porto
- Póvoa Casino and Póvoa Grand Hotel, Póvoa de Varzim
- Restoration of the Chancel of the Romanesque Church of São Pedro de Rates, Póvoa de Varzim
