= Português Suave architecture =

Poortuguese architectural style during the Estado Novo period

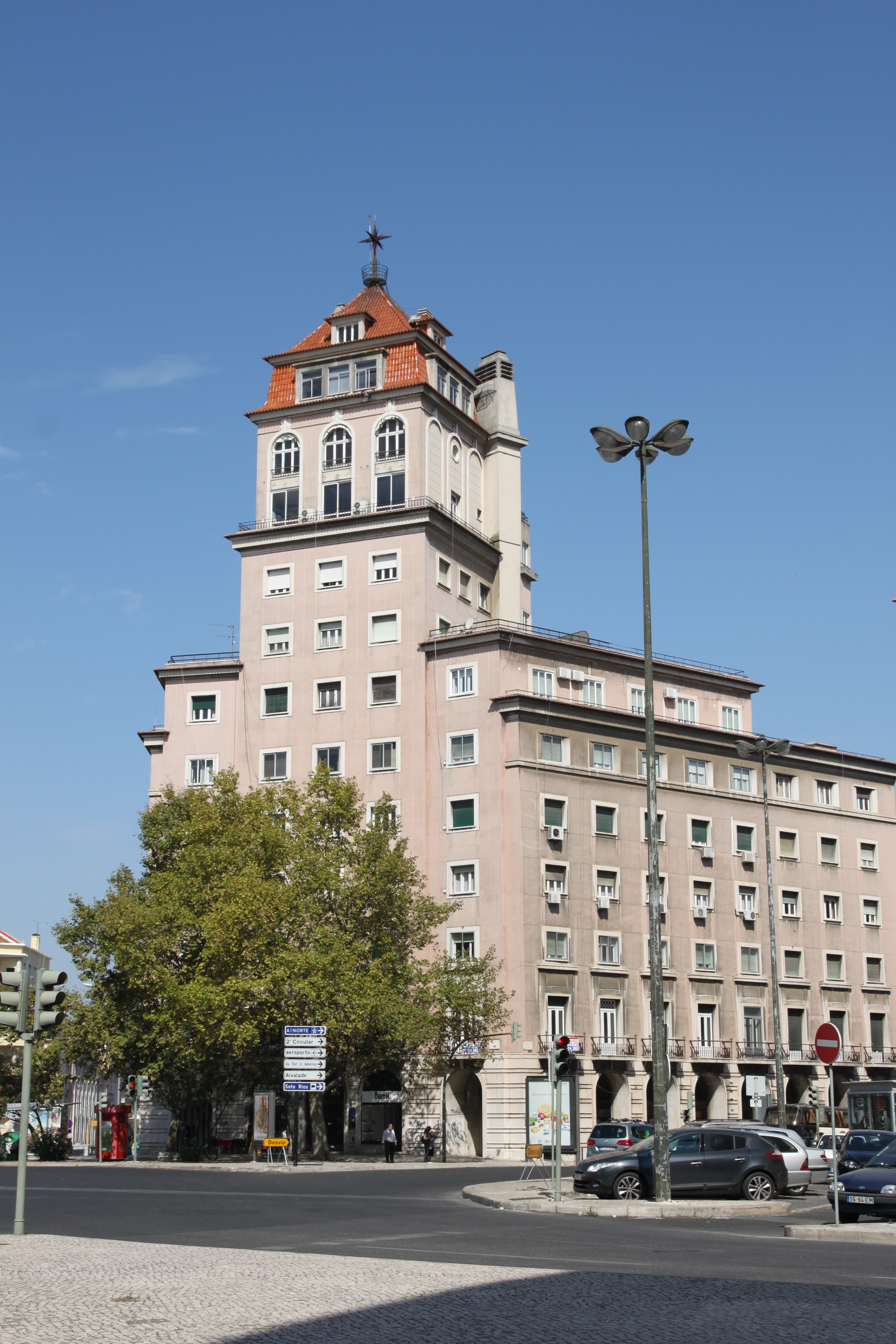
Areeiro Square building in Lisbon

The Português Suave (which can be translated as "Portuguese soft" or "Portuguese smooth") was an architectural style promoted by the Portuguese Estado Novo (New State) regime, essentially during the 1940s and the early 1950s. Officially promoted by the Portuguese government at the time as Estilo Português ("Portuguese Style"), it became more popularly known as "Português Suave" after a brand of cigarettes of the same name. This architectural style is also known as Estado Novo style, but this last denomination is not very correct, since during the Estado Novo diverse architectural styles have been applied in public buildings (namely the Art Deco and the Modern movement until the 1940s and the International Style after the late 1950s).

== History ==
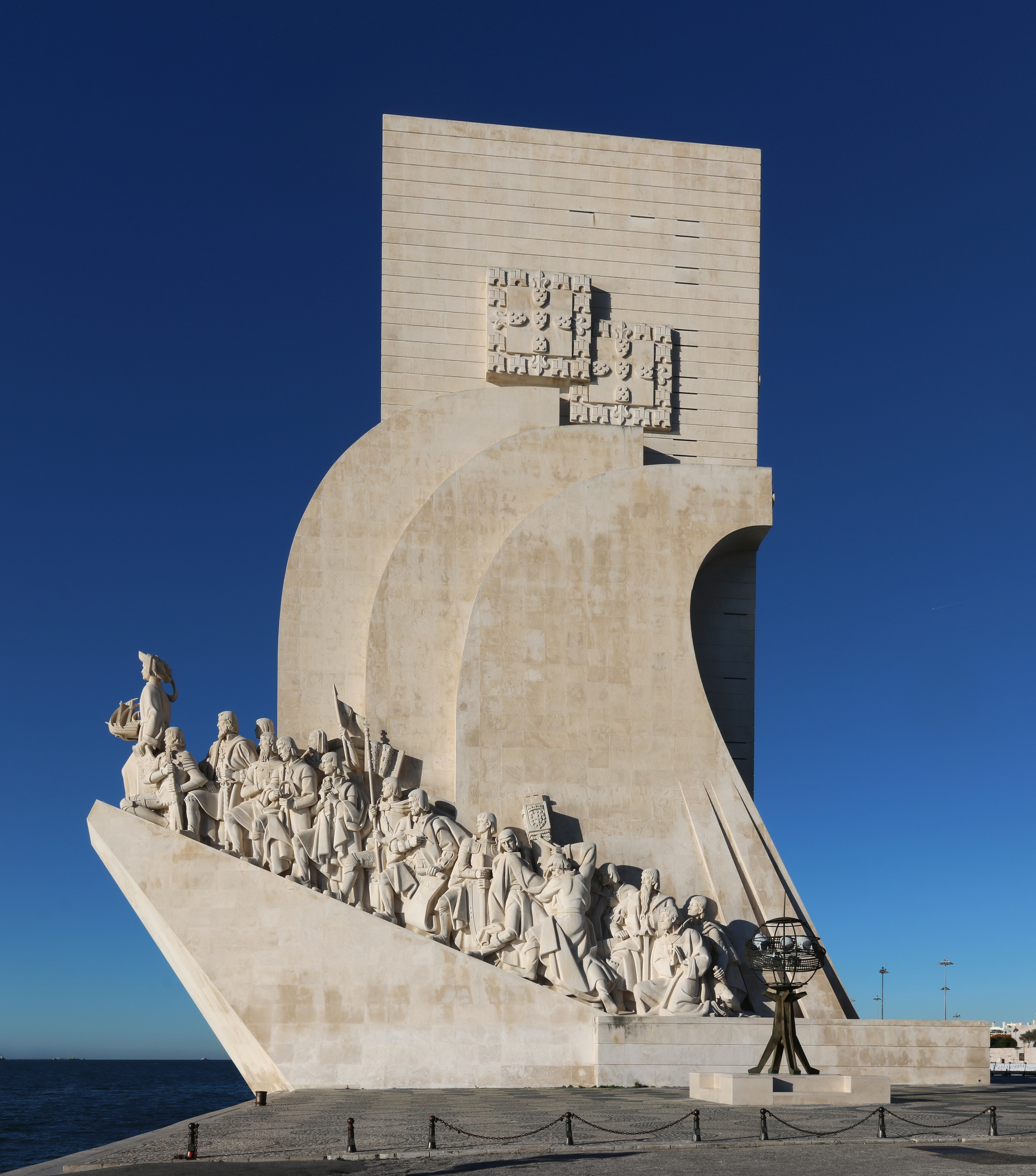
Monument to the Discovery Age in Belém, Lisbon. Inaugurated during the Portuguese World Exhibition

Português Suave was the result of the ideas of several Portuguese architects who, from the beginning of the 20th century, looked to create "genuine Portuguese architecture". One of the mentors of this style was the architect Raul Lino, creator of the theory of the "Portuguese house". The result of this current was the creation of a style of architecture that used modern construction techniques, decorated using a mixture of exterior aesthetic elements borrowed from the ancient and traditional Portuguese architecture.

The Portuguese Estado Novo regime, an authoritarian nationalist regime resulting from the 28 May Revolution and led by Oliveira Salazar, embarked upon a wide-ranging public works policy, beginning in the 1930s. Initially, in new public buildings, a monumental modernist style prevailed, with Art Deco characteristics. However, after the Portuguese World Exhibition in 1940, whose chief architect was José Cottinelli Telmo, the Portuguese Government started to prefer a nationalistic style for its new public constructions. This style was used in all types of public buildings, from small rural elementary schools to big secondary schools and university campuses, military barracks, courts of justice, hospitals, town halls and so on.

Outside of what was then the Portuguese metropole, this style was also widely used in public buildings of the Portuguese overseas territories in Africa, Asia and Oceania. The style was also very popular in the private sector, being used in all types of buildings, from the small family homes to blocks of flats, hotels, office blocks, commercial and industrial buildings.

The style was criticized by a great number of young architects who accused it of being provincial and devoid of imagination. Its nickname, by which it was most commonly known, "Portuguese Suave", was given to it ironically by its critics, who had compared it to a brand of cigarettes of the same name. The biggest blow to the style was struck by the 1948 1st Portuguese National Congress of Architecture, which meant that it gradually came to be abandoned for both public and private works. From the mid-50s, state-sponsored public works started using more modernist architectural styles.

Despite criticism by many intellectuals, the Português Suave architecture proved to be popular, corresponding to the tastes of a segment of the Portuguese people. Its characteristics, although attenuated, have returned and can be seen in numerous private buildings built since the 1990s.

== Characteristics ==
Typical buildings of the Portuguese Suave style used modern architectural engineering techniques, making use of concrete structures with a high build quality. However, in contrast to modernist buildings, modern techniques and lines were hidden under ornamental elements.

The ornamental elements in the style were borrowed from the architecture of the 17th and 18th centuries and from regional Portuguese architectural styles. Typically, decorative elements such as rough rock, peaked tiled roofs, pinnacles, pilasters, balconies, etc. were used. Many, especially larger building, also had arches and towers topped with national symbols such as armillary spheres.

== Types ==
=== Courtrooms ===
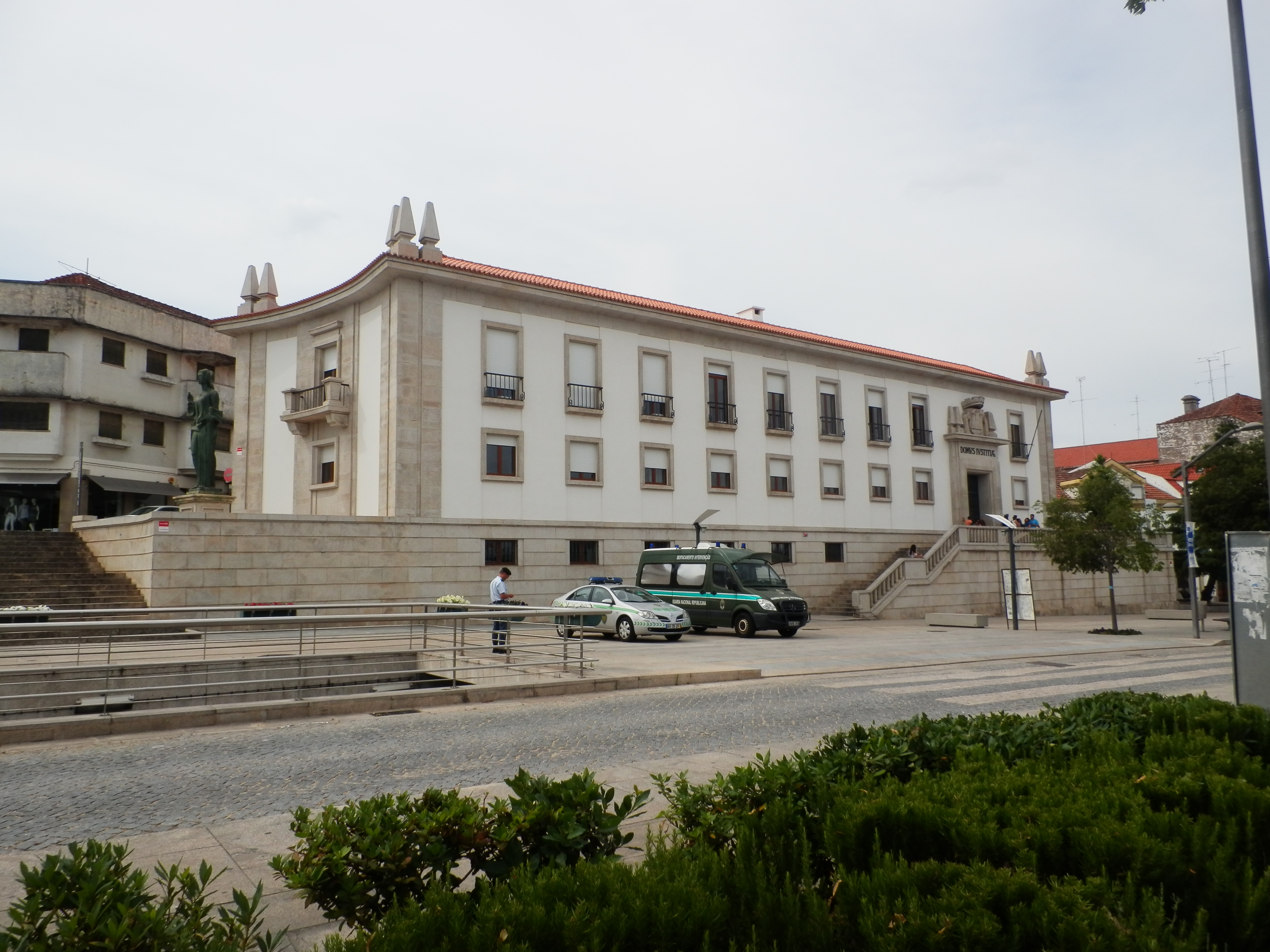
Courthouse in Castelo Branco

This type of building is considered, together with the townhalls, the "noble type" of Português Suave. They are usually characterized by harsh forms, using colonnades and large porticos to impose their monumentality. There is a symbolic concern of associating the architecture of these buildings with the idea of judicial power (intrinsically linked to state power) combined with an austere and classical spirit. A good example of the characteristics described is the Palácio de Justiça do Porto (1961) where the colonnades play a fundamental role in terms of the global ideology that the building must make visible; the almost violent austerity and monumentality make this courthouse one of the most representative of this functional type.

=== Town halls ===
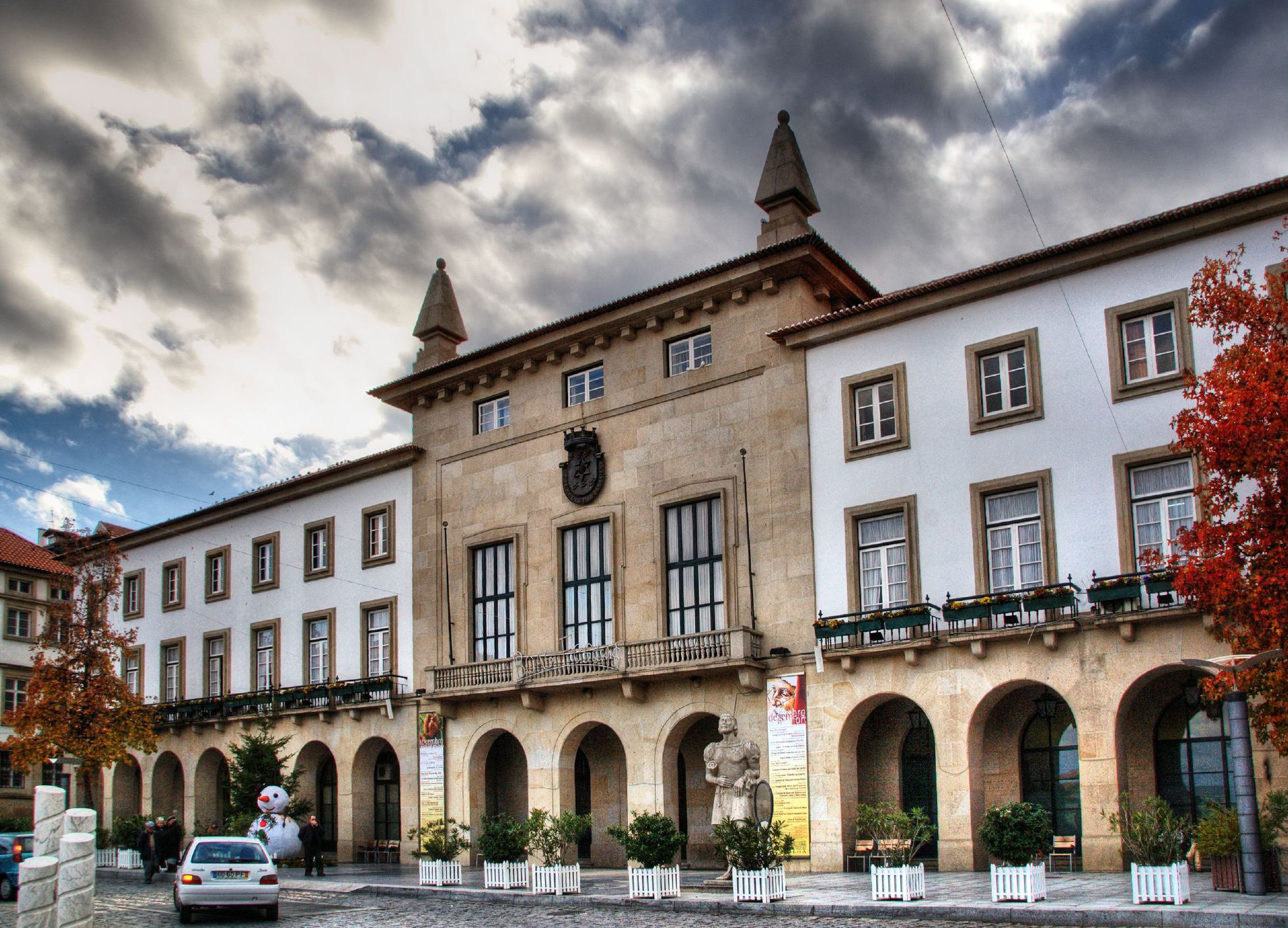
Town hall of Covilhã

Town halls are part of the "noble type" of the Portuguese Suave together with coutrooms. Comparing the two typologies, the townhalls are more eclectic and have a freer form, not as tied to ideas of power and austerity of judicial buildings (despite being closely linked to these expressions). They also have a more historical and nationalist theme associated with them; sometimes there are illustrative panels on the facades, or on the porticoes, relating to various aspects of the city's life, such as its work or its history. An example of a town hall of this style, although not very representative, is the town hall building of Póvoa de Lanhoso; this building is connected to the local courtroom pragmatically joining the two noble buildings of the village.

=== Banks: Caixa Geral de Depósitos e Créditos e Providência ===
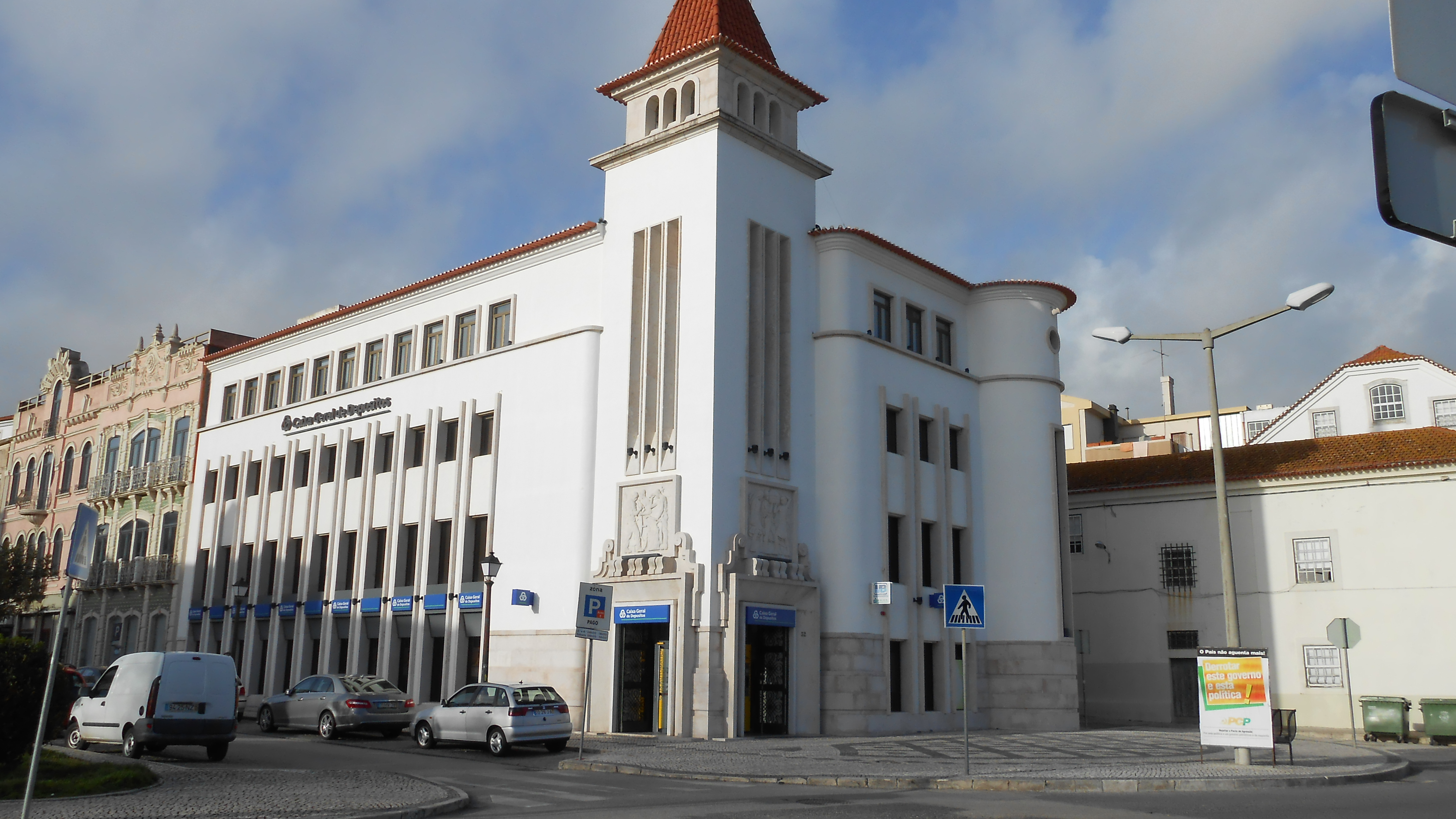
Bank building in Figueira da Foz

This type of building was fundamental to the economy of the country's cities and towns. They were normally located in the citycenter, so that any inhabitant of the area could reach them easily. They were built with the aim of appearing quite solid and resistant, to convey to the population that their money and operations were safe. There are several typologies throughout the Portuguese territory; from appearing like urban manors, to the typical classic building, with large turrets topped by high spires. The building of the Caixa Geral de Depósitos of Santarém shows the austere but sober nature of this functional type. The tower and tall windows give the public the much-needed sense of security that should always be associated with such a building.

=== Post offices ===
Postal, telephone and telegraph buildings are a special case. The fact that throughout the 30s and 40s, a single architect, Adelino Nunes, was responsible for designing these works, left little room for major technical and formal innovations, which reflects in their low diversity. This fact allows the various facilities built all over the country to be divided in 3 building levels:

Simple - for more humble villages, in a more historical-regionalist style. An example of this is Fafe's post office. Medium - for towns with some importance, or small towns, in a more modern and innovative style. The north are characterized by granite and the south by whitewashed walls. Two examples, one for each case, are the post office of Valença, in the north, and those in Évora, in the south. Postal Palaces - for large cities, in an eclectic style that mixes regionalism, modernity and monumentality. The most relevant example of this type of building is the Palácio dos Correios ("Palace of the Post") in Lisbon.

=== Schools ===
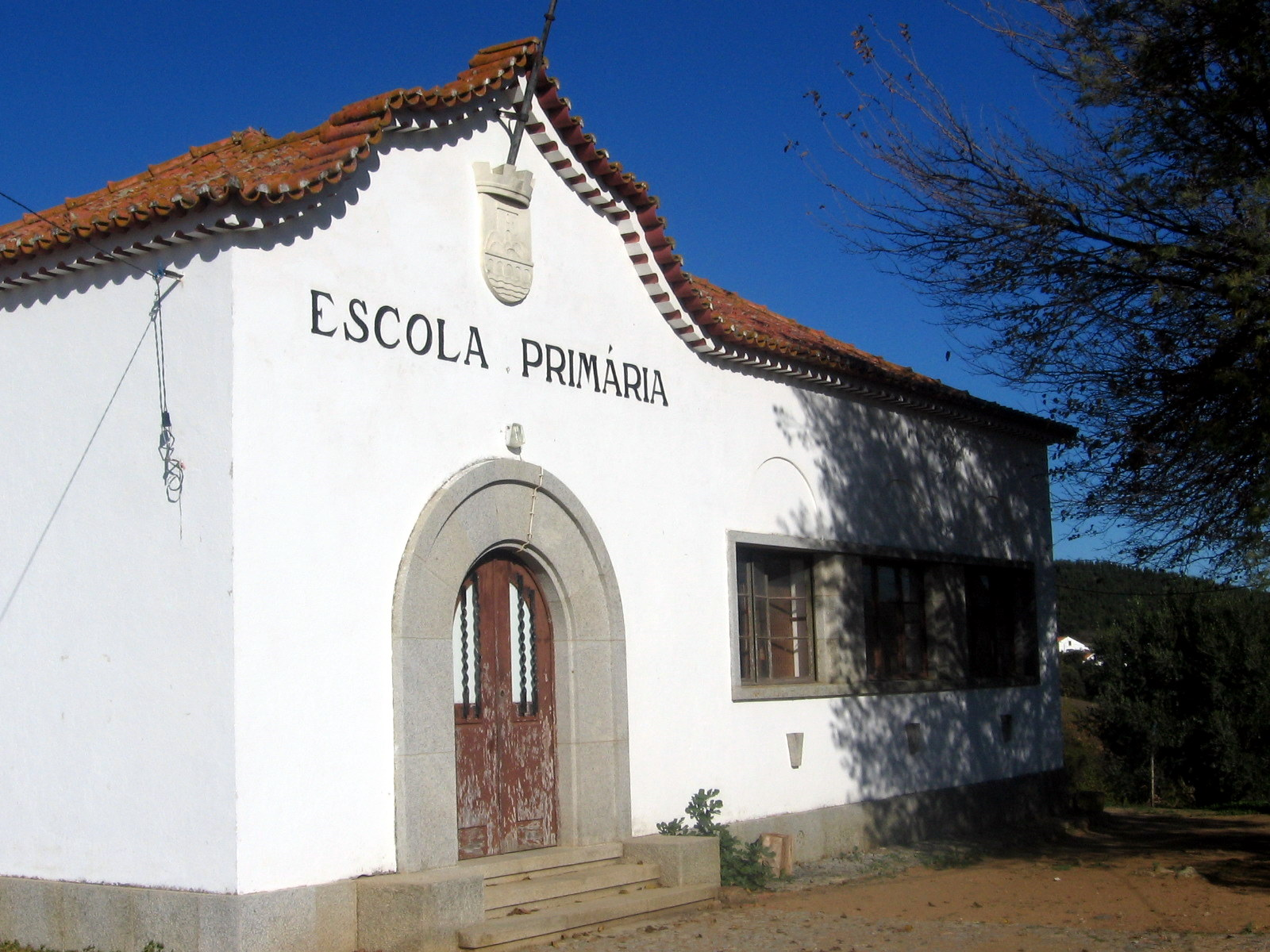
Primary school, São Brissos, Santiago do Escoural, Montemor-o-Novo.

The primary schools of this period were part of a project known as Escolas dos Centenários by Rogério de Azevedo. The architect drew up a standard plan describing the way to build such educational establishments. There were small variants that tried to fit the buildings into the architectural panorama of the place where they were located; schools in the south were characterized by arches and whitewashed walls, and in the north by porches and the use of granite.

High schools were based on a very different idea from primary schools. These were installed in large houses with 17th and 18th century airs with large galleries and tiled roofs. As with the primary schools, most of these buildings were for mixed education; to that extent, and according to the ideas of the time, boys and girls frequented different wings of the builds, making them symmetrical. Some of these schools were associated with neighborhoods, such as the school in the Ajuda neighborhood. As far as universities are concerned, as they assumed a much larger size they were treated as urban ensembles.

=== Religious works ===
The sanctuary of Fátima was the greatest religious work of the regime. In general, churches built in this style were stylized in concrete. A work that still stands out is the statue of Christ the King in Almada.

=== Monuments and Infrastructure ===
There was a demand on the part of the State to assert itself on a large scale associated with the need to carry out major works of basic equipment (water, sewage, electricity, road network). As examples of monuments we have the Fonte Luminosa in Lisbon. In terms of infrastructure, there is the Castelo de Bode dam.

=== Housing ===
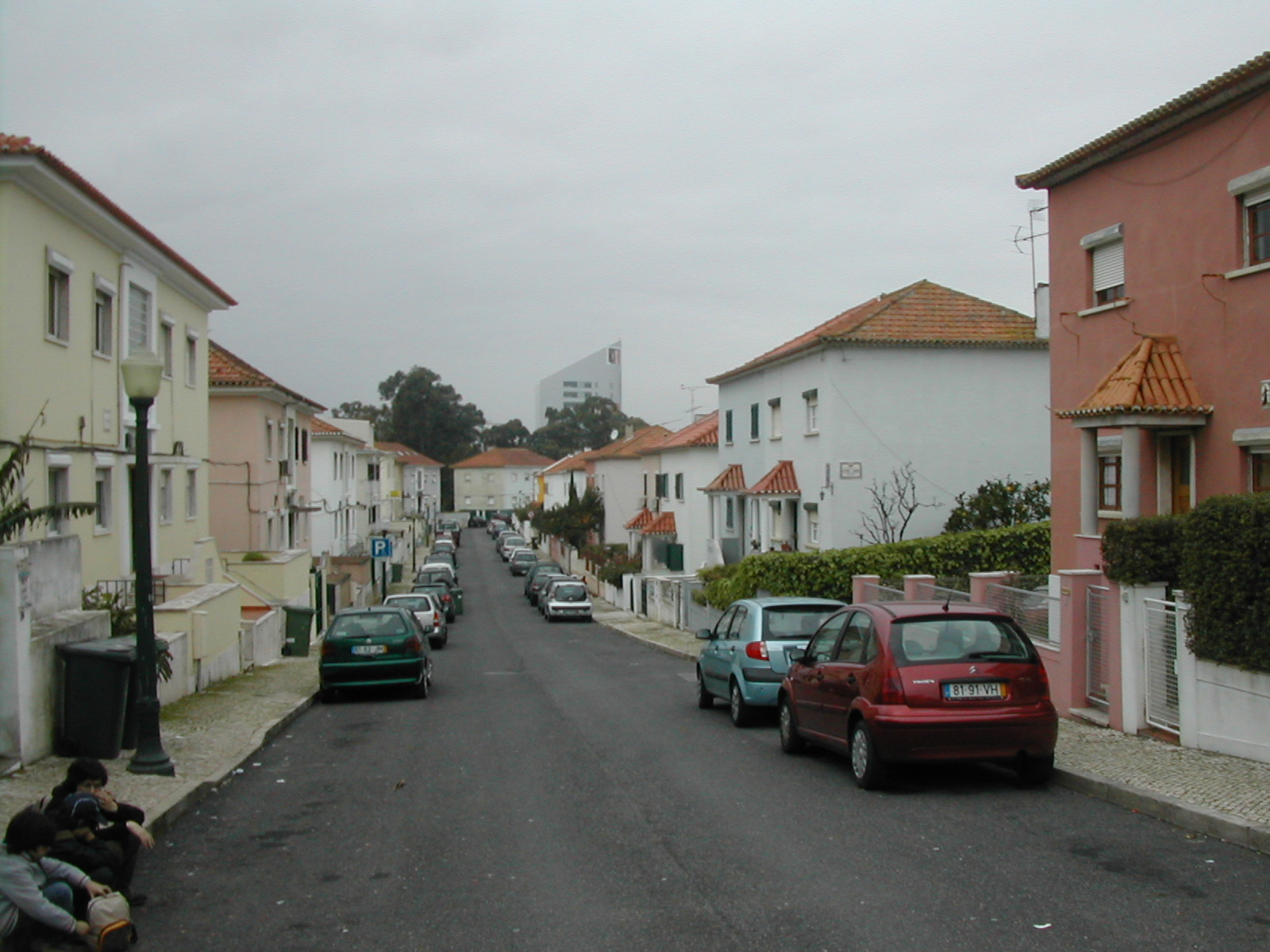
Social housing in Caselas, Lisbon

Housing constituted one of the biggest problems of the Salazar regime in the capital. The Lisbon population increased from year to year and there was a need to build places to house all these people. The process was treated in various ways. Housing is divided into three categories: income buildings, single-family or semi-detached houses, and social housing.

Income buildings have symmetrical shapes, where traditional materials are used, with little protrusion and smooth facades. At the same time, buildings of this type were progressive in terms of the technology used (reinforced concrete, pillar-beam-slab system), but traditional in their appearance. Characterized by stone foundations, framed windows, bay windows with a decorative wrought iron balcony, tiled roofs (sometimes use of spires) and stone colonnades on the facade.

Single-family houses are typically made up of a wide tile roof with an eaves, a facade painted in white or light colors, use of stone in the opening frames, wooden shutters usually painted green and a covered porch or terraces with a tile roof. Sometimes there are works in tiles or ceramics with traditional motifs, pieces in wrought iron (flowers, weather vanes and gates).

Social neighborhoods (or residential complexes) were large clusters of "economic housing" (or of "Economic Income") consisting of single-family houses, or more commonly, semi-detached houses. Social neighborhoods were built in the most unqualified areas of the city. The first neighborhood, which served as a prototype of the neighborhoods included in Duarte Pacheco's project, Novos Bairros, was Bairro Salazar, better known as Bairro do Alvito (1938). Apart from the economic housing neighborhoods, elementary neighborhoods also emerged, such as Bairro do Alto da Serafina; and also districts of prefabricated houses, such as Bairro de Caselas and the districts that were left unfinished during the First Republic, such as Bairro do Arco do Cego, were completed.

== Architects ==
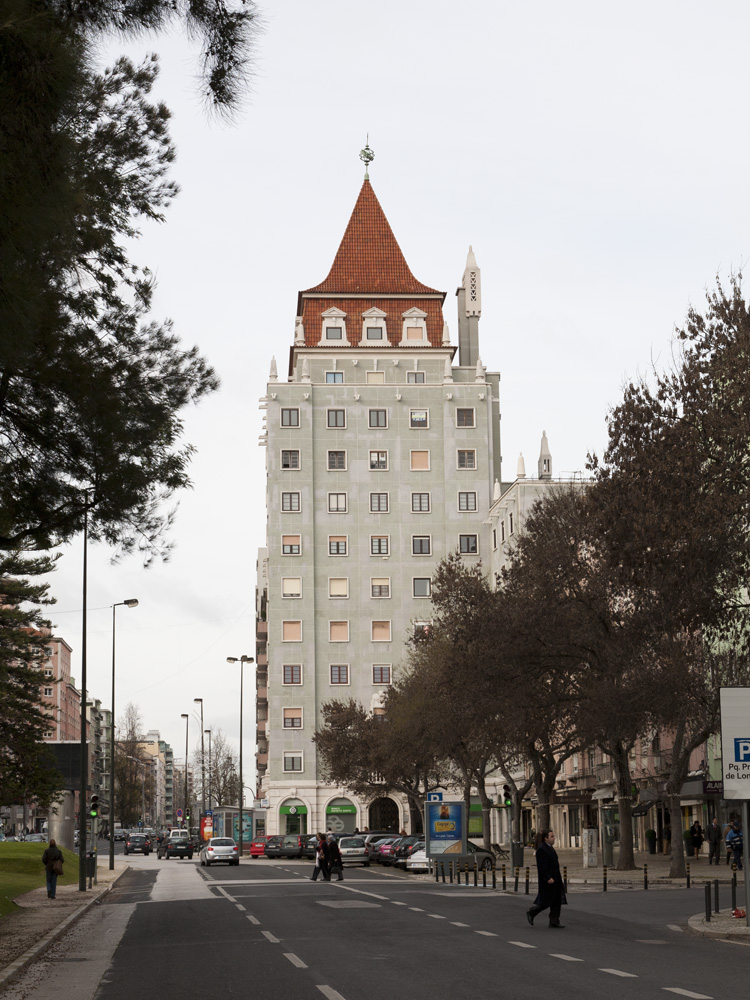
Residential tower in Lisbon, by Cassiano Branco

- Adelino Nunes
- Carlos Ramos
- Carlos Rebello de Andrade
- Cassiano Branco
- Cottinelli Telmo
- Cristino da Silva
- Guilherme de Rebello Andrade
- João Simões
- Jorge Segurado
- Keil do Amaral
- Pardal Monteiro
- Paulino Montez
- Raul Rodrigues Lima
- Rogério de Azevedo
- Vasco Regaleira
- Veloso Reis Camelo

== Gallery ==
=== In Portugal ===
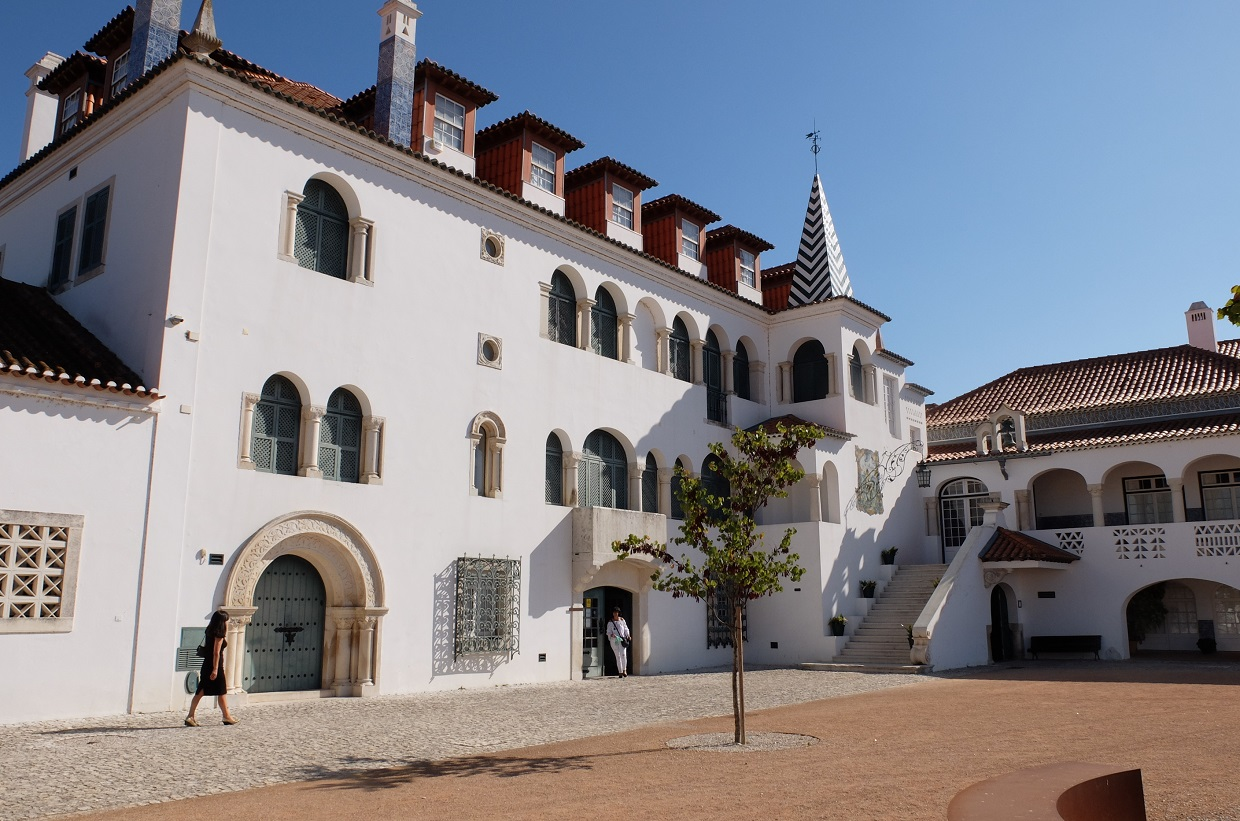
Casa dos Patudos, residential palace (example of a Português Suave style predecessor), Alpiarça.

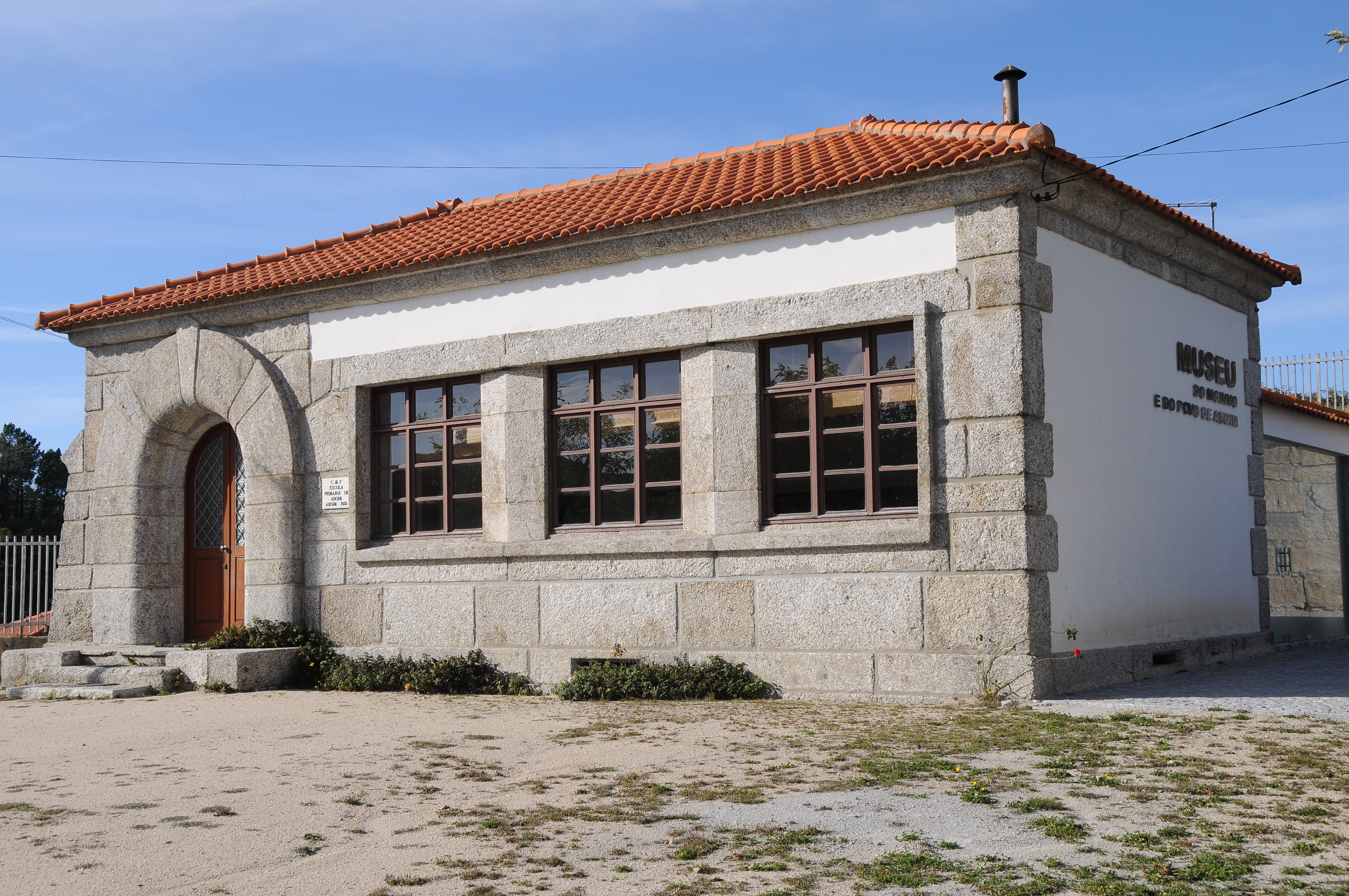
Former primary school, Fafe.

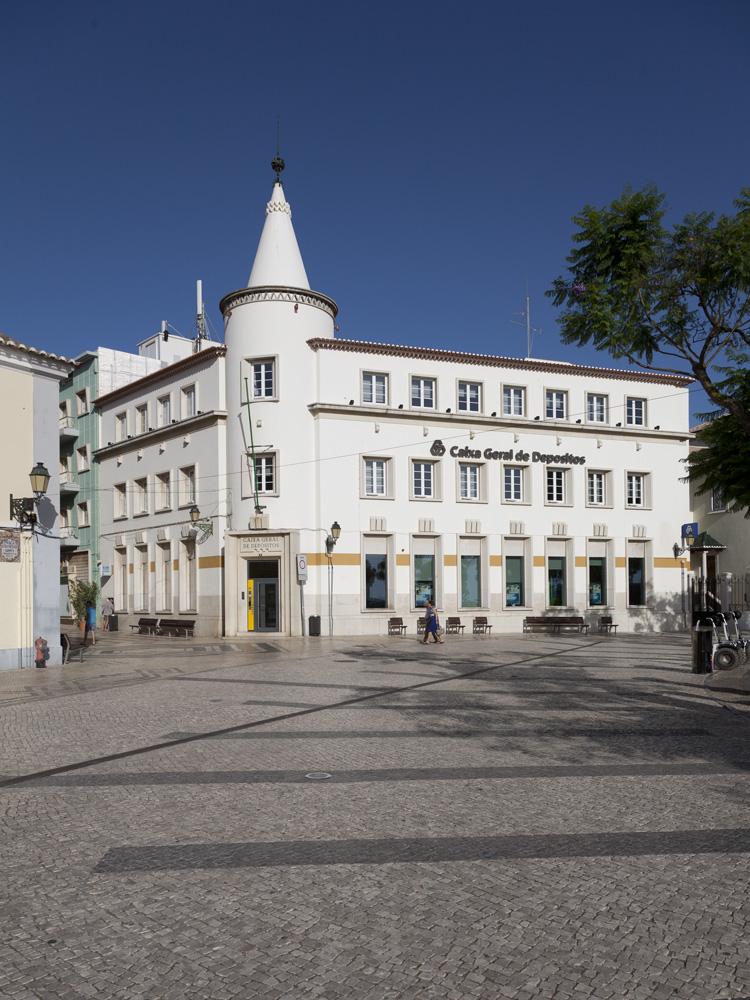
Bank branch, Faro

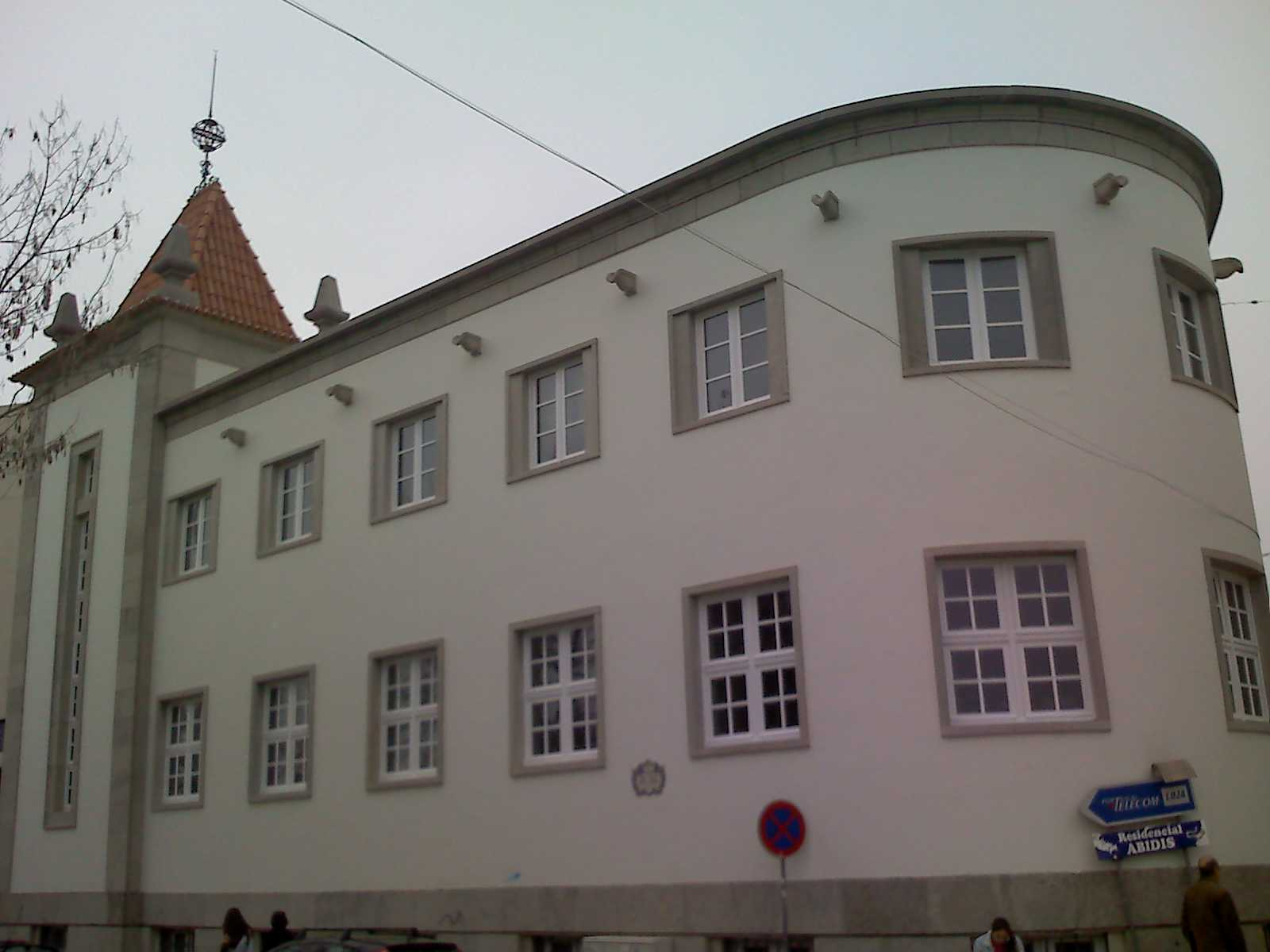
Bank branch, Santarém

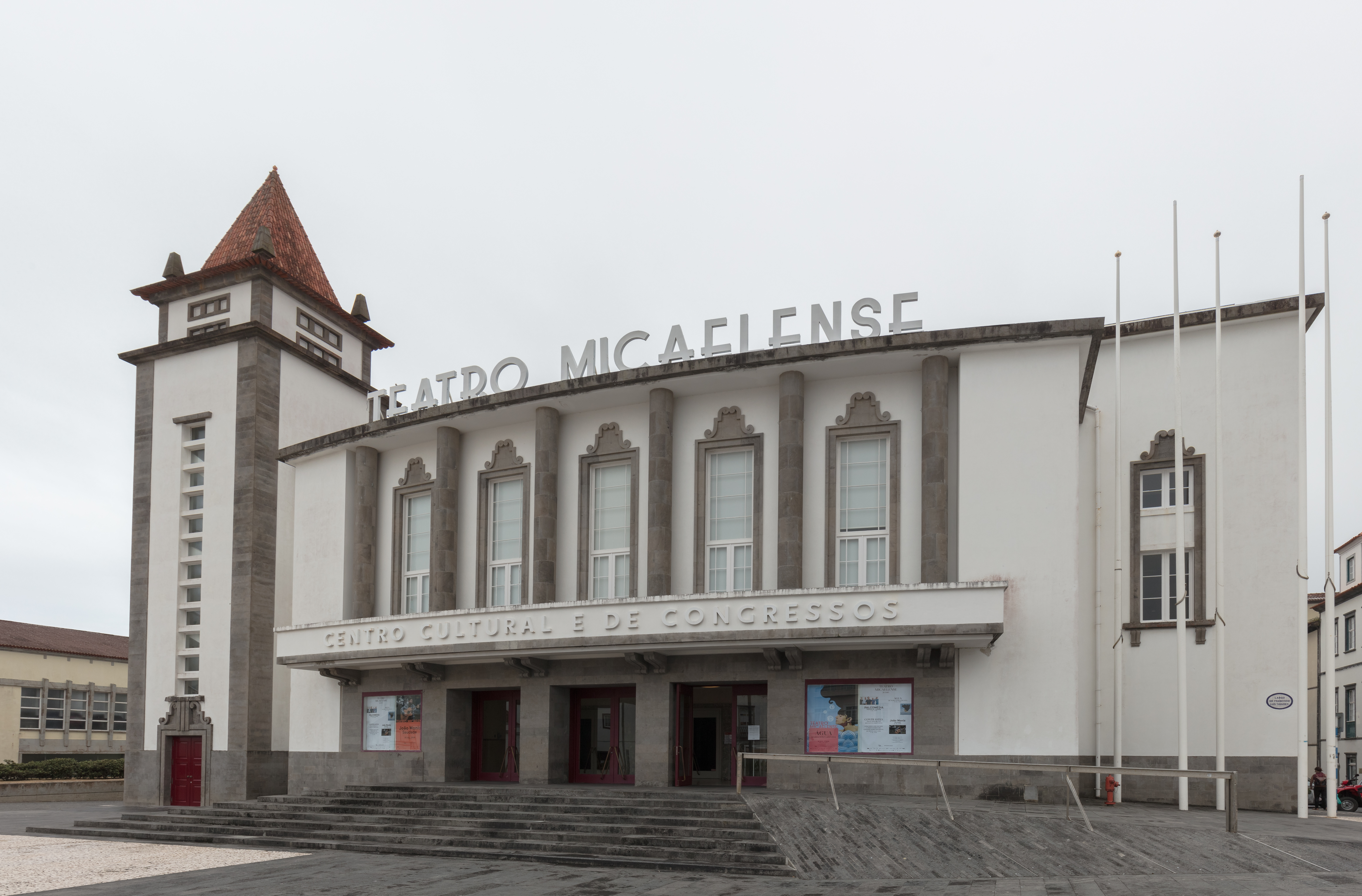
Micaelense theater house, São Miguel, Azores.

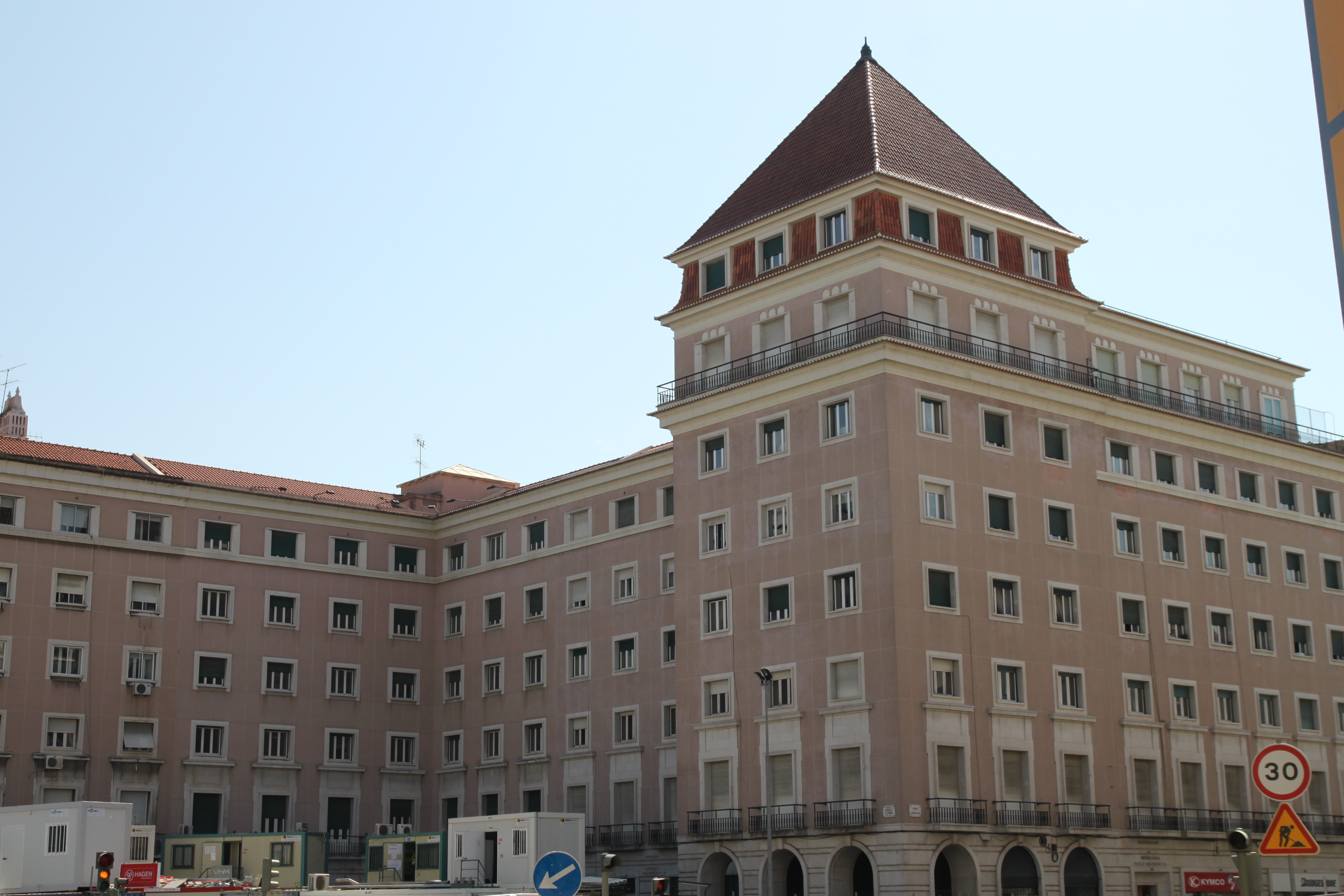
Residential block in Areeiro, Lisbon.

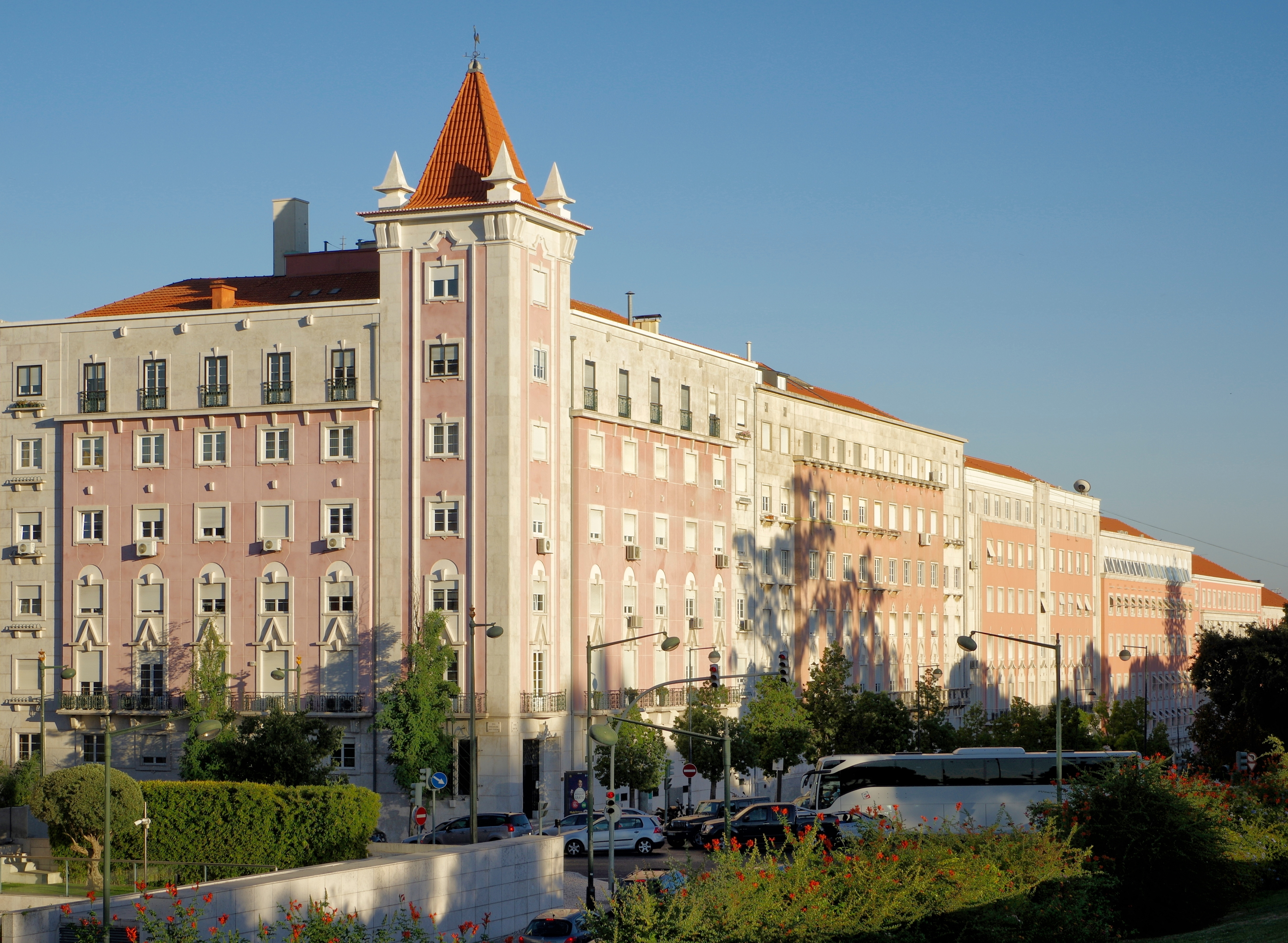
Row of high-income residential buildings, Lisbon.

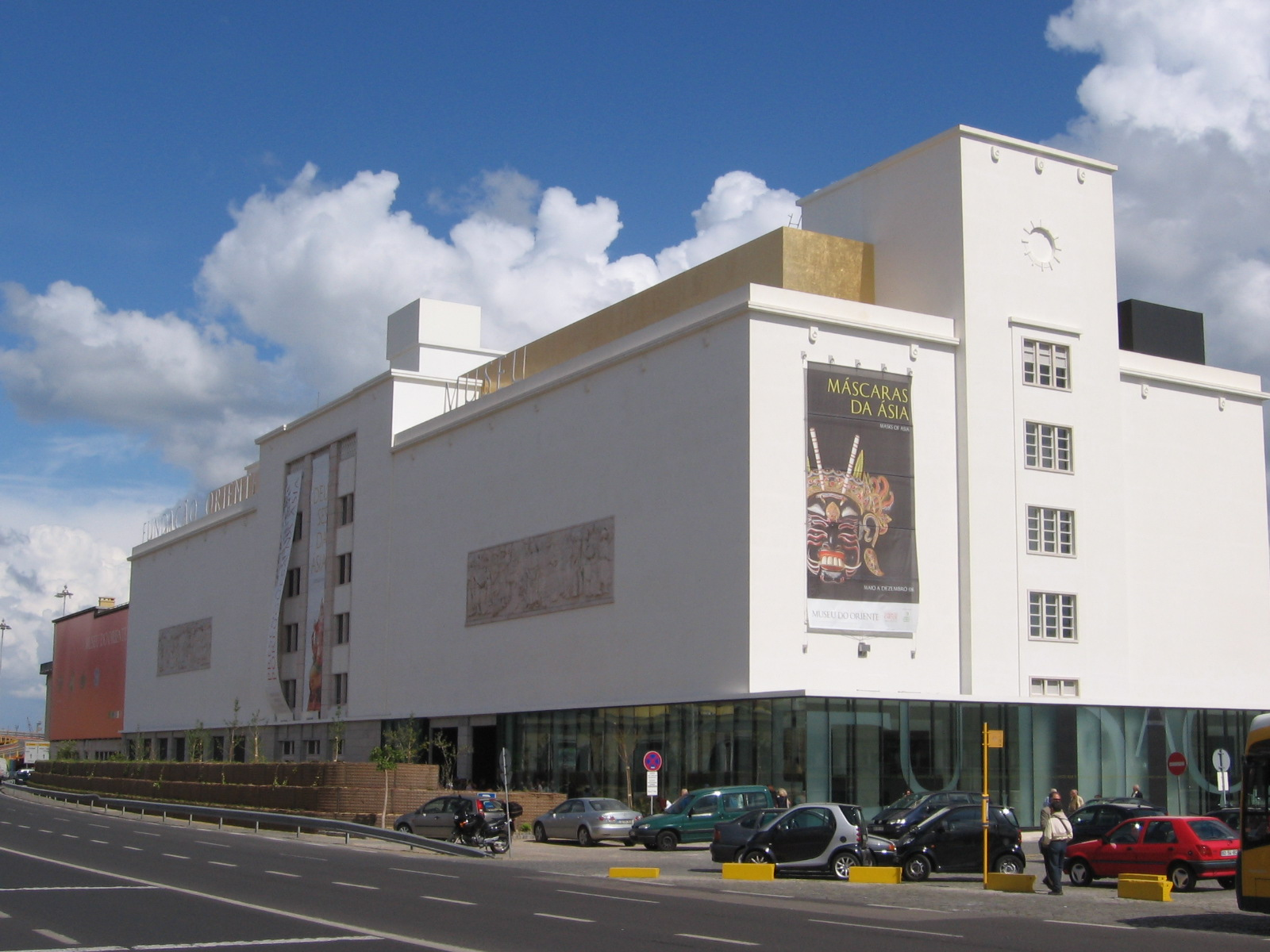
Former industrial warehouses converted into a Museum.

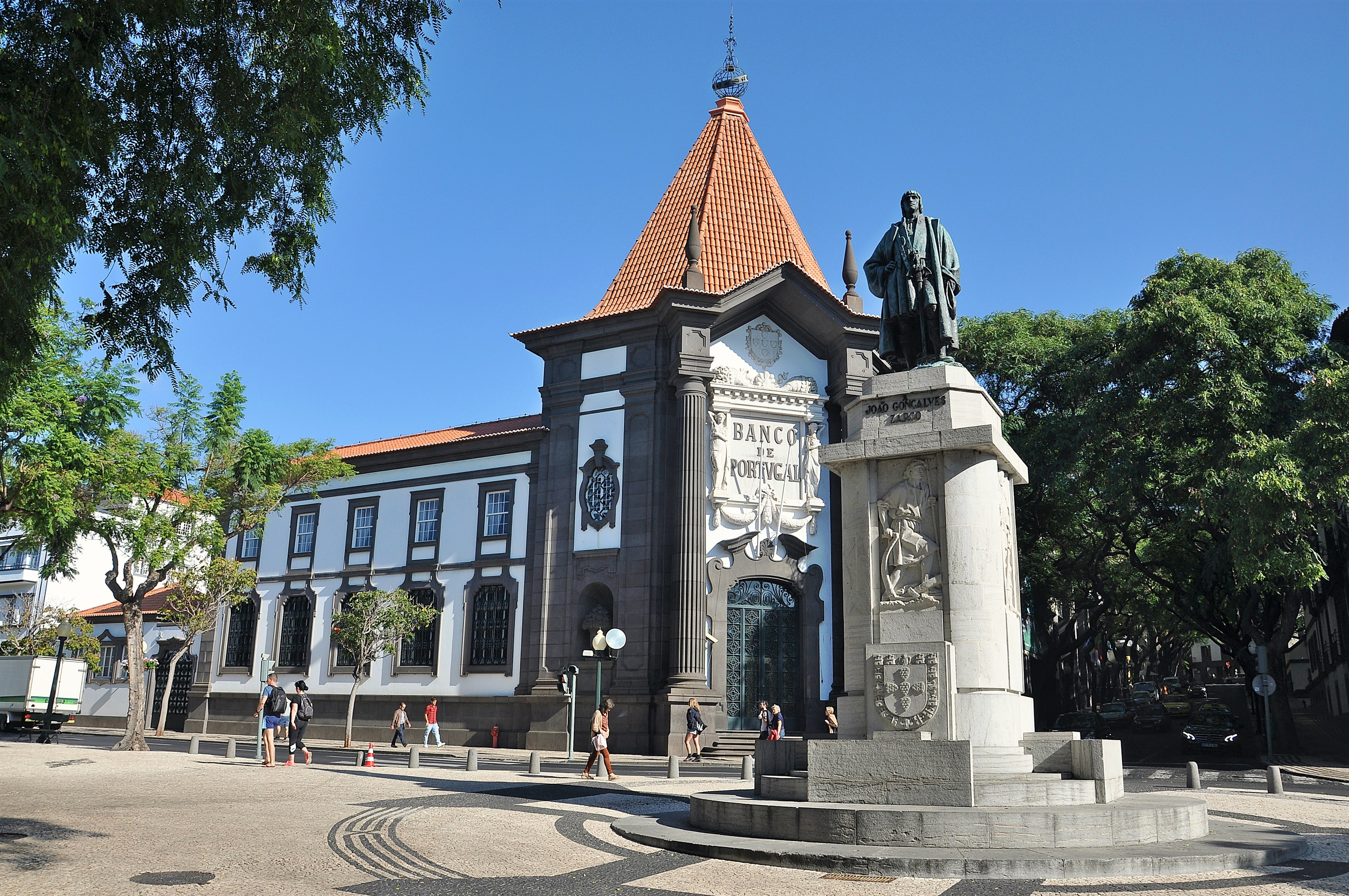
Bank of Portugal branch, Funchal.

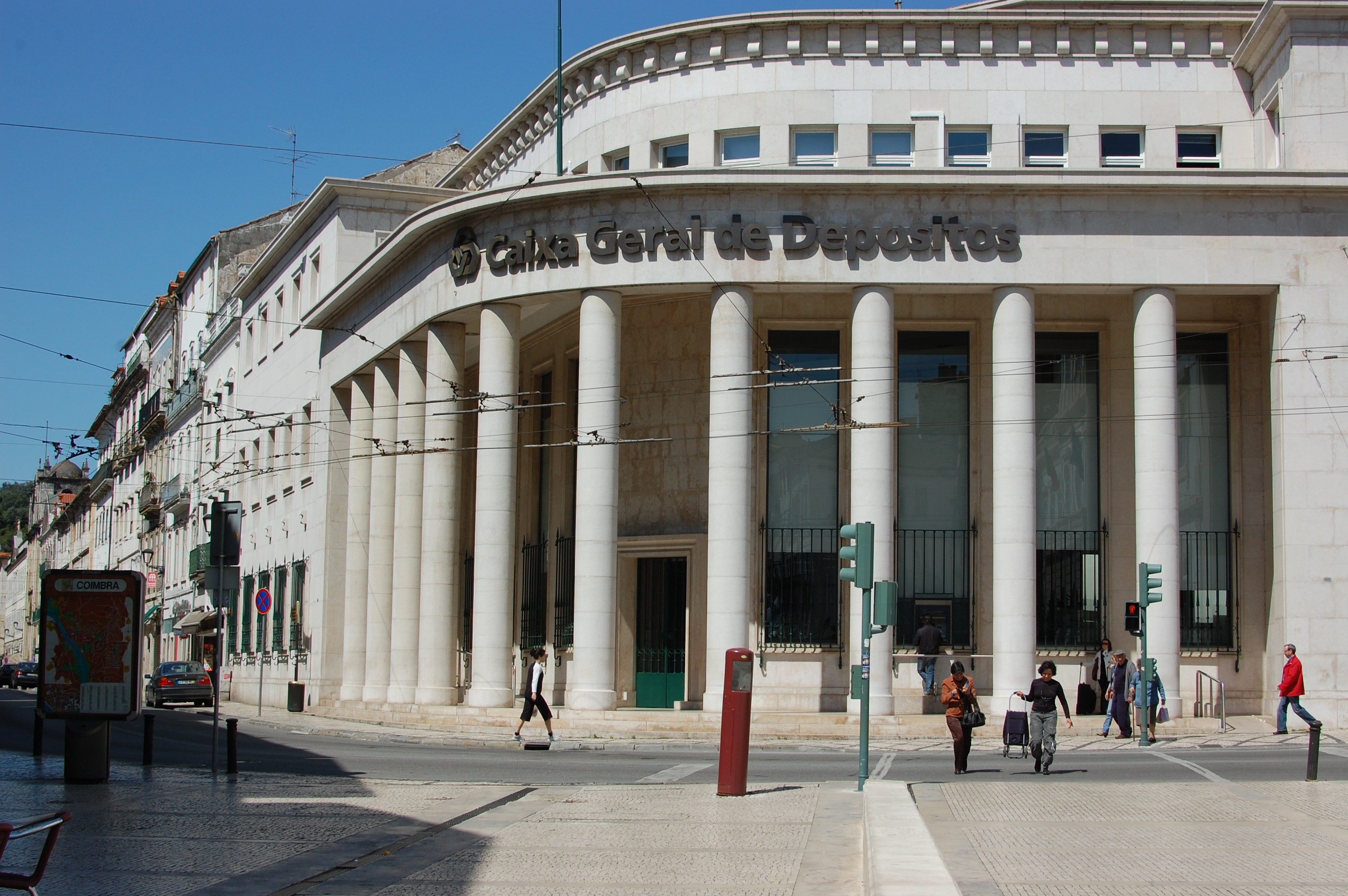
Caixa Geral de Depósitos branch, Coimbra.

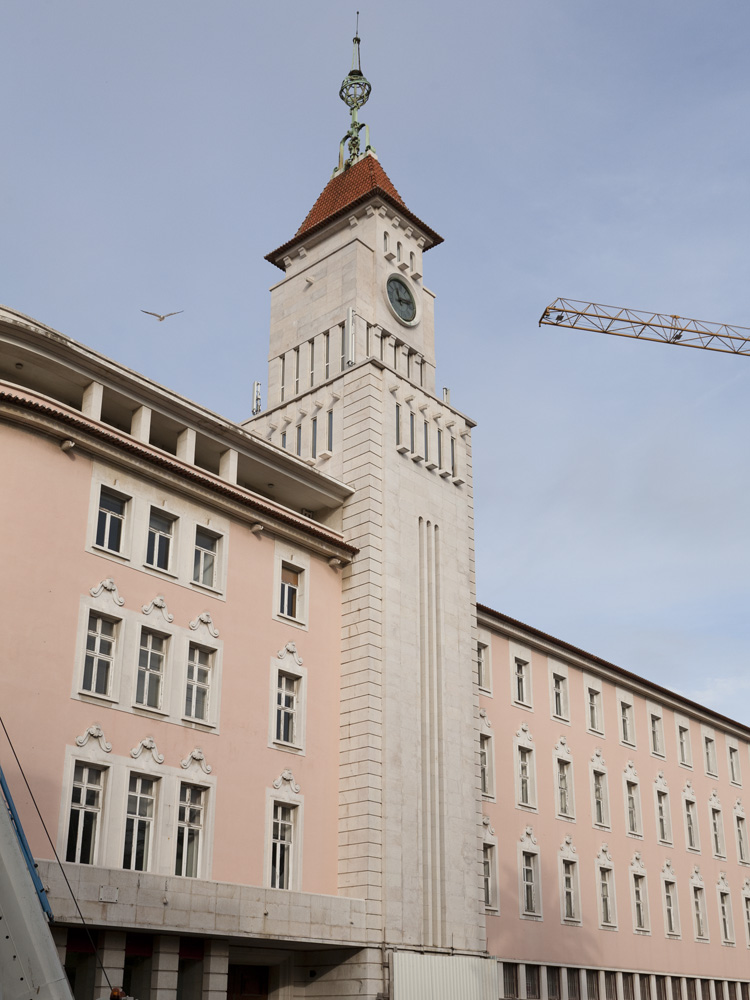
Communications Palace, Lisbon.

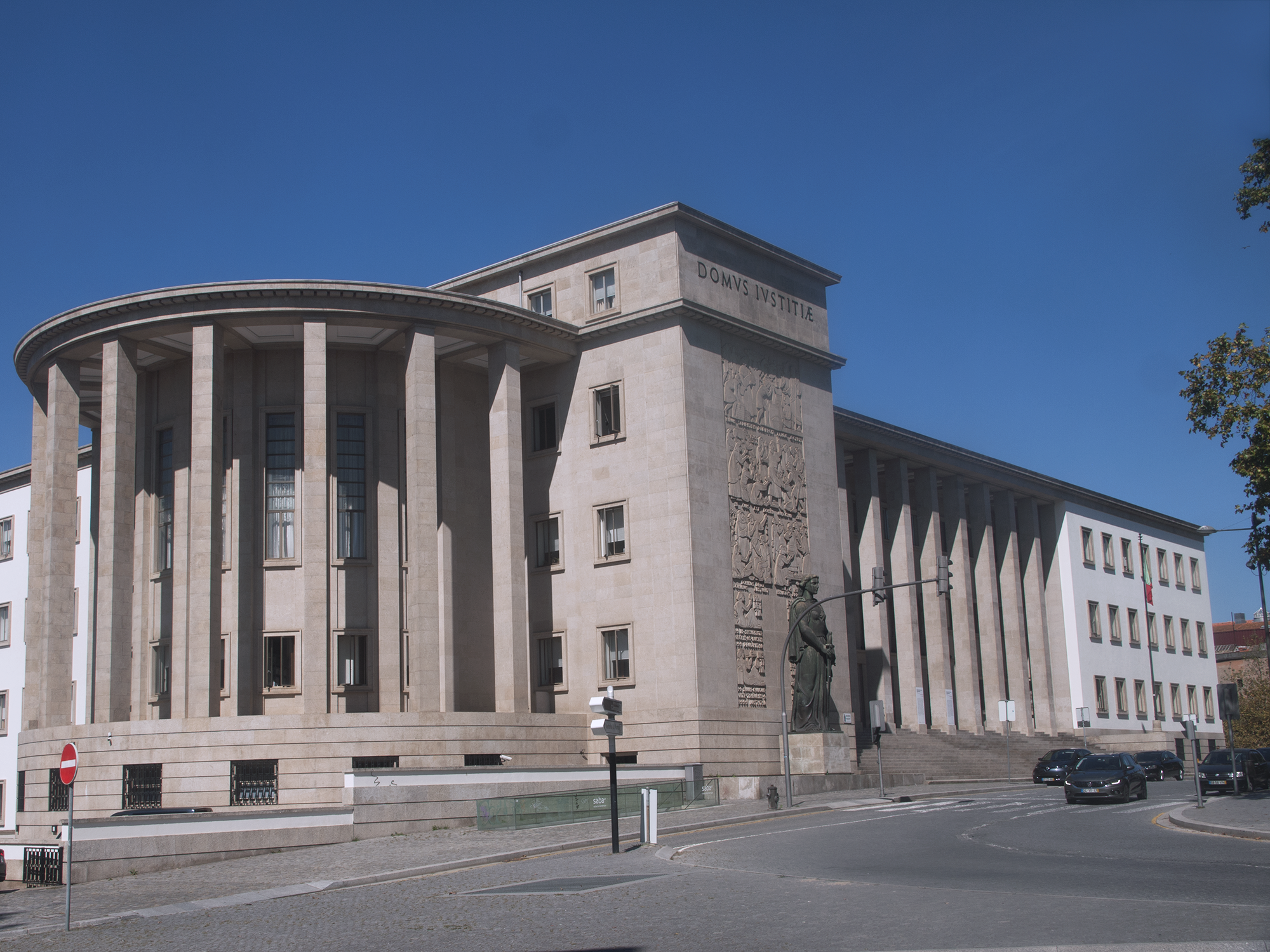
Justice Palace, Porto.

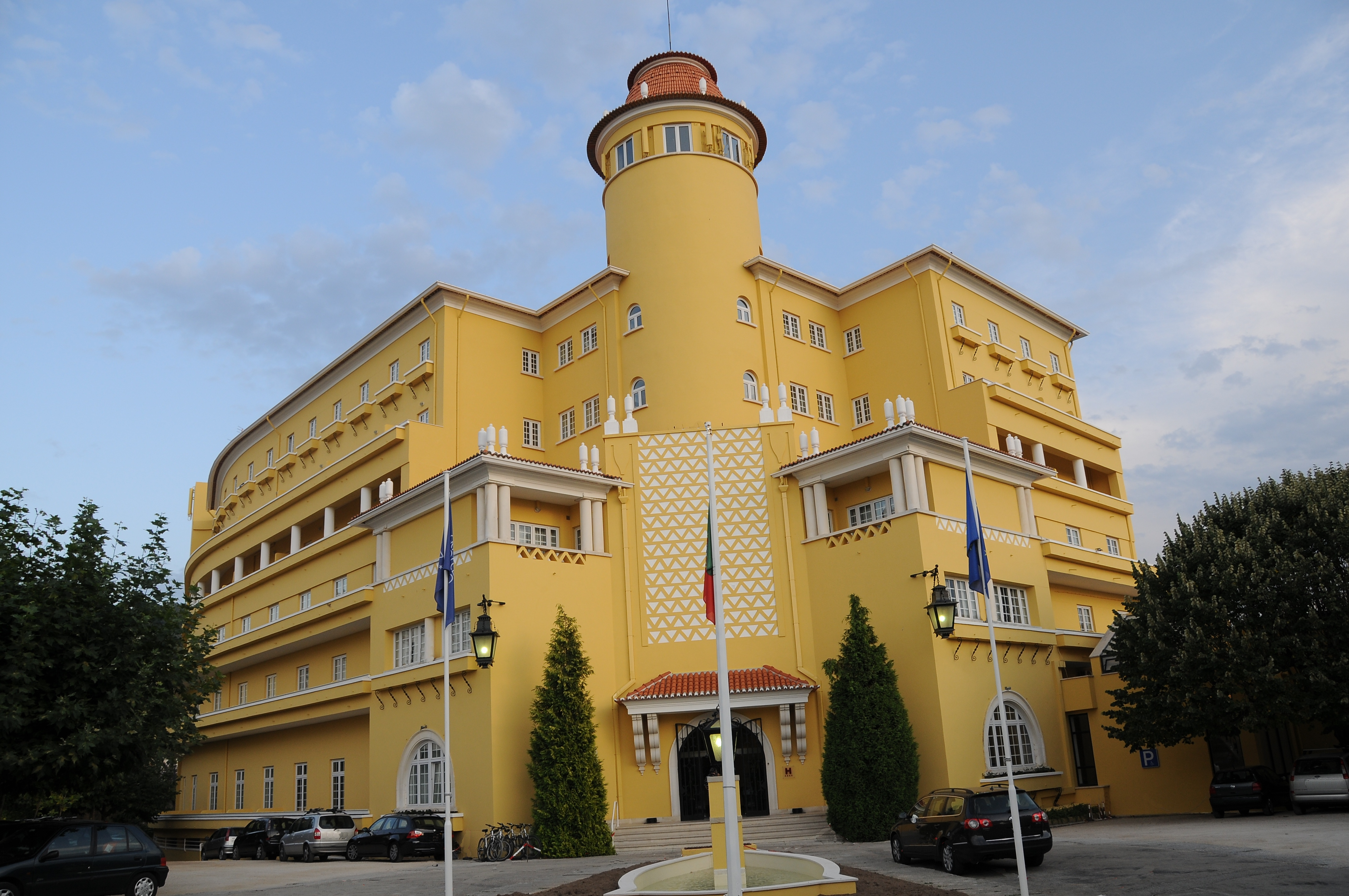
Grande Hotel Luso.

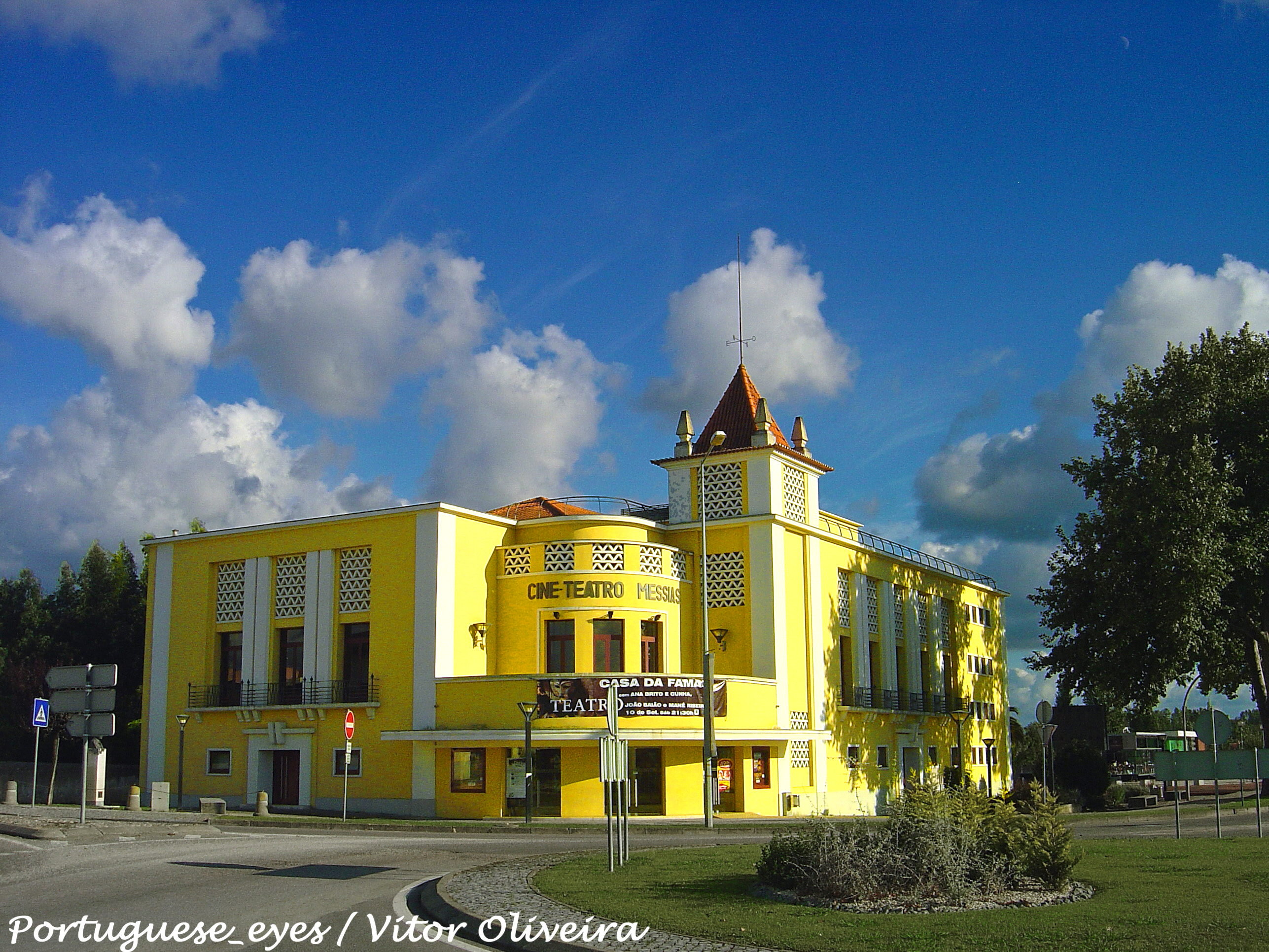
Messias municipal cine-theater, Mealhada.

Church in Campo de Ourique, Lisbon.

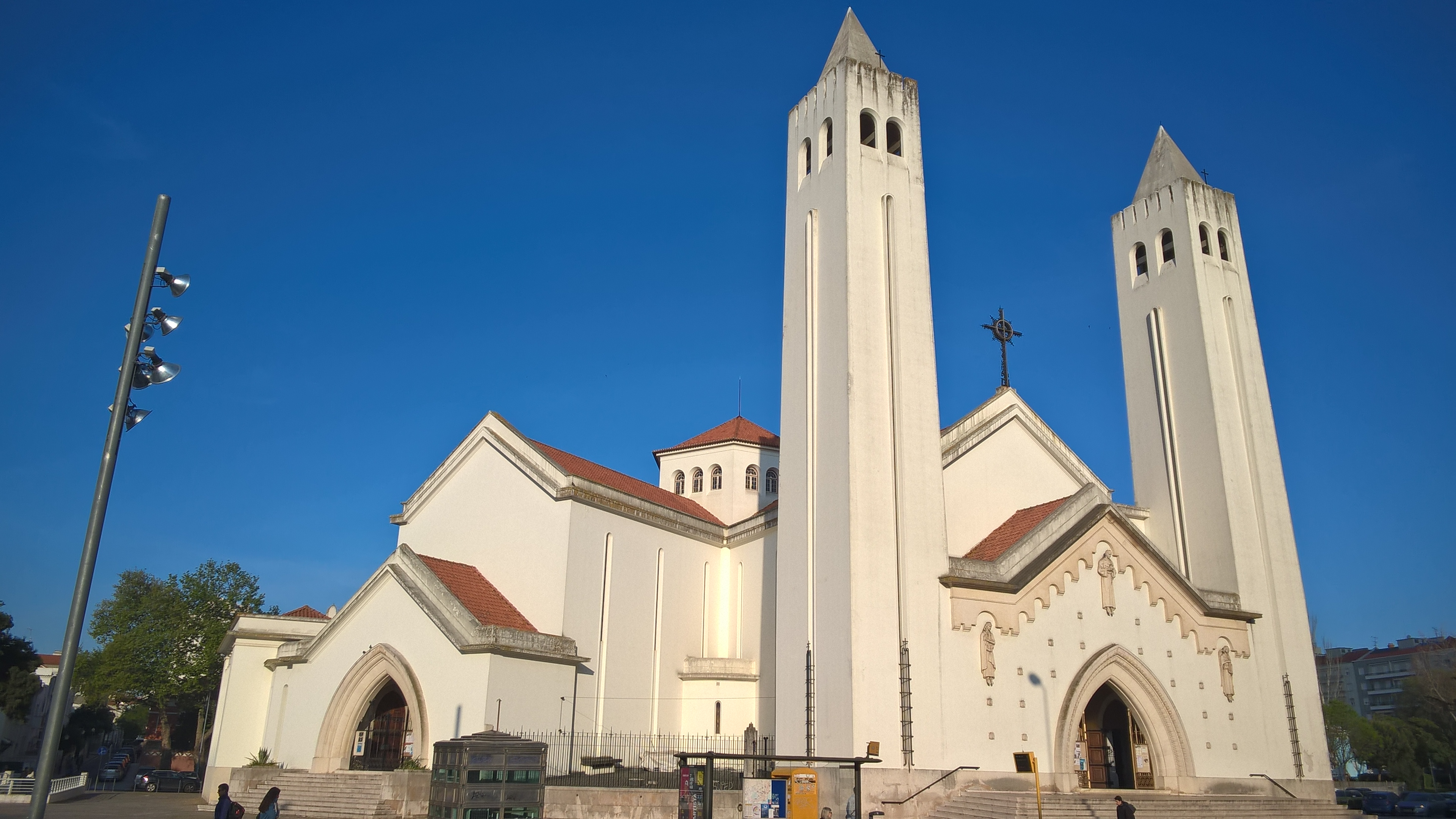
São João de Deus Church, Lisbon.

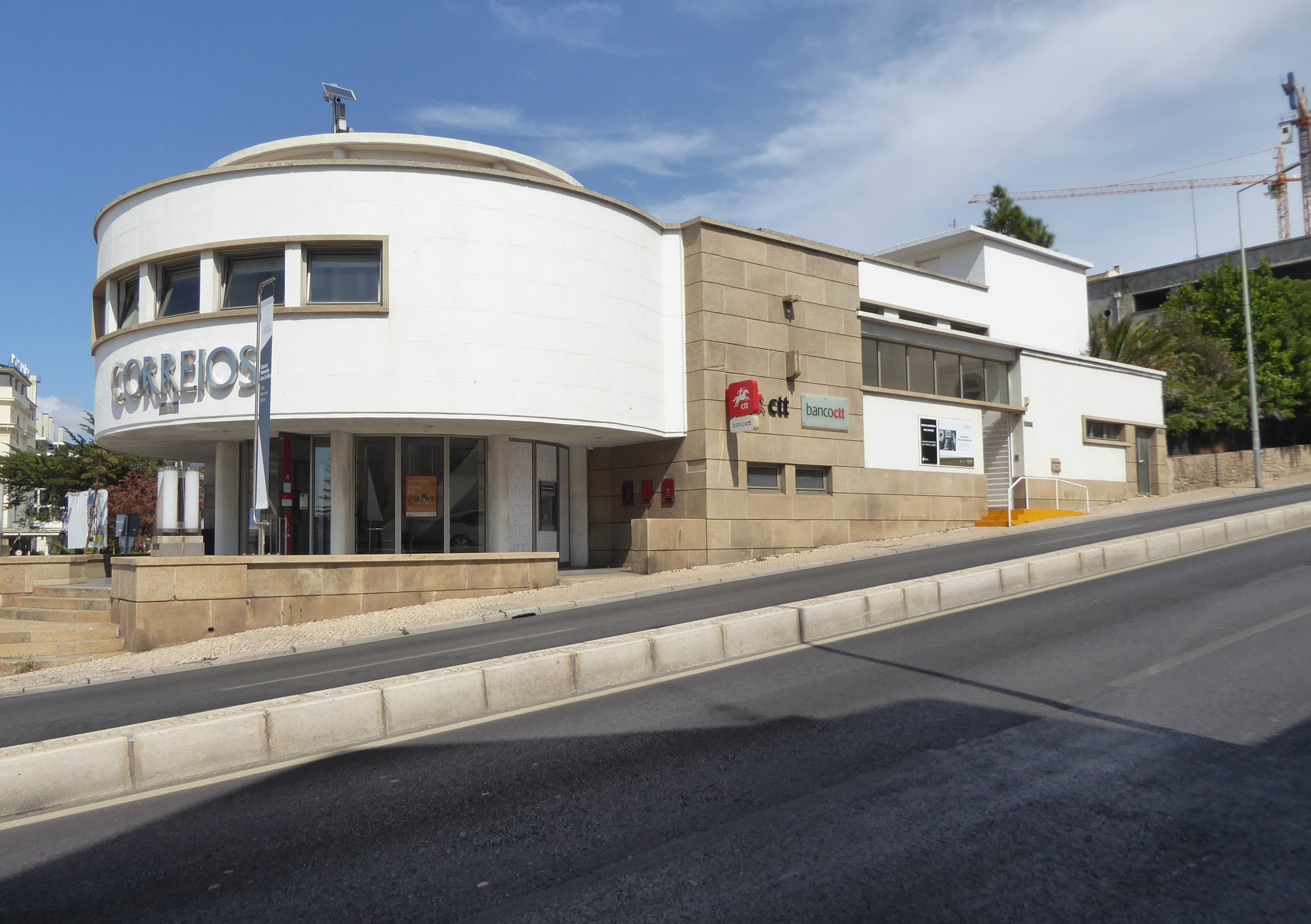
Estoril post office.

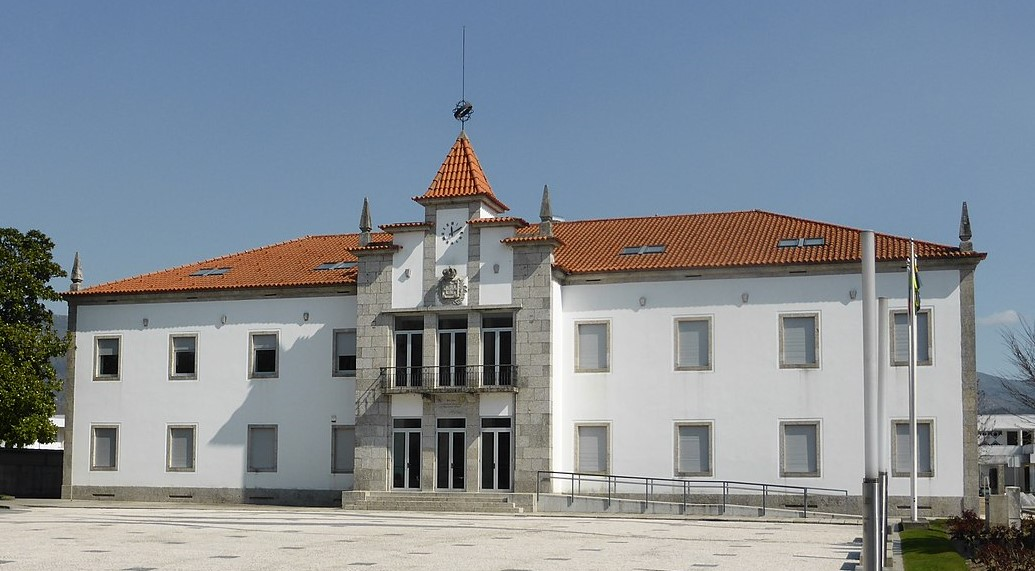
Vieira do Minho city hall.

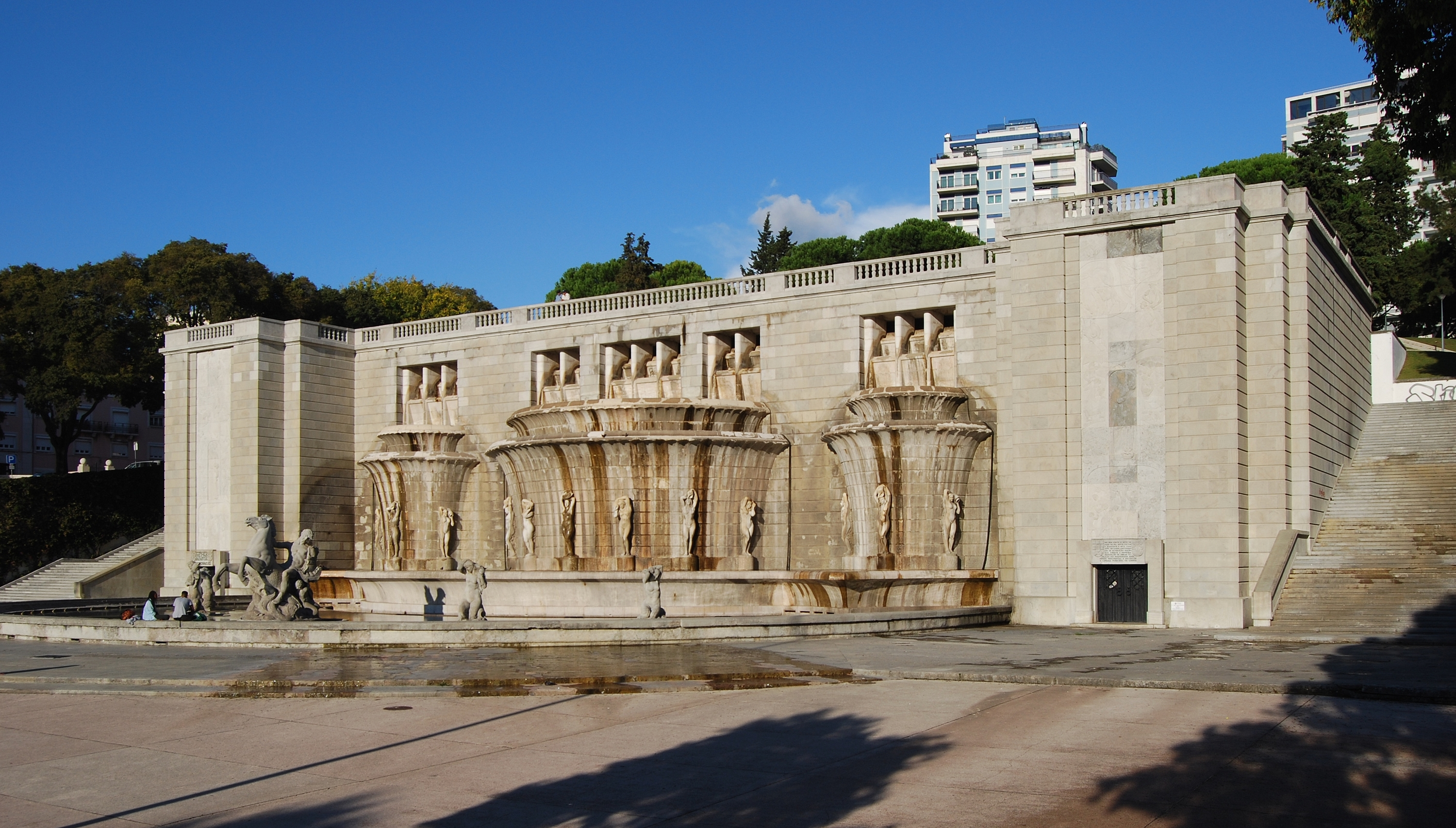
Fonte Luminosa, Lisbon.

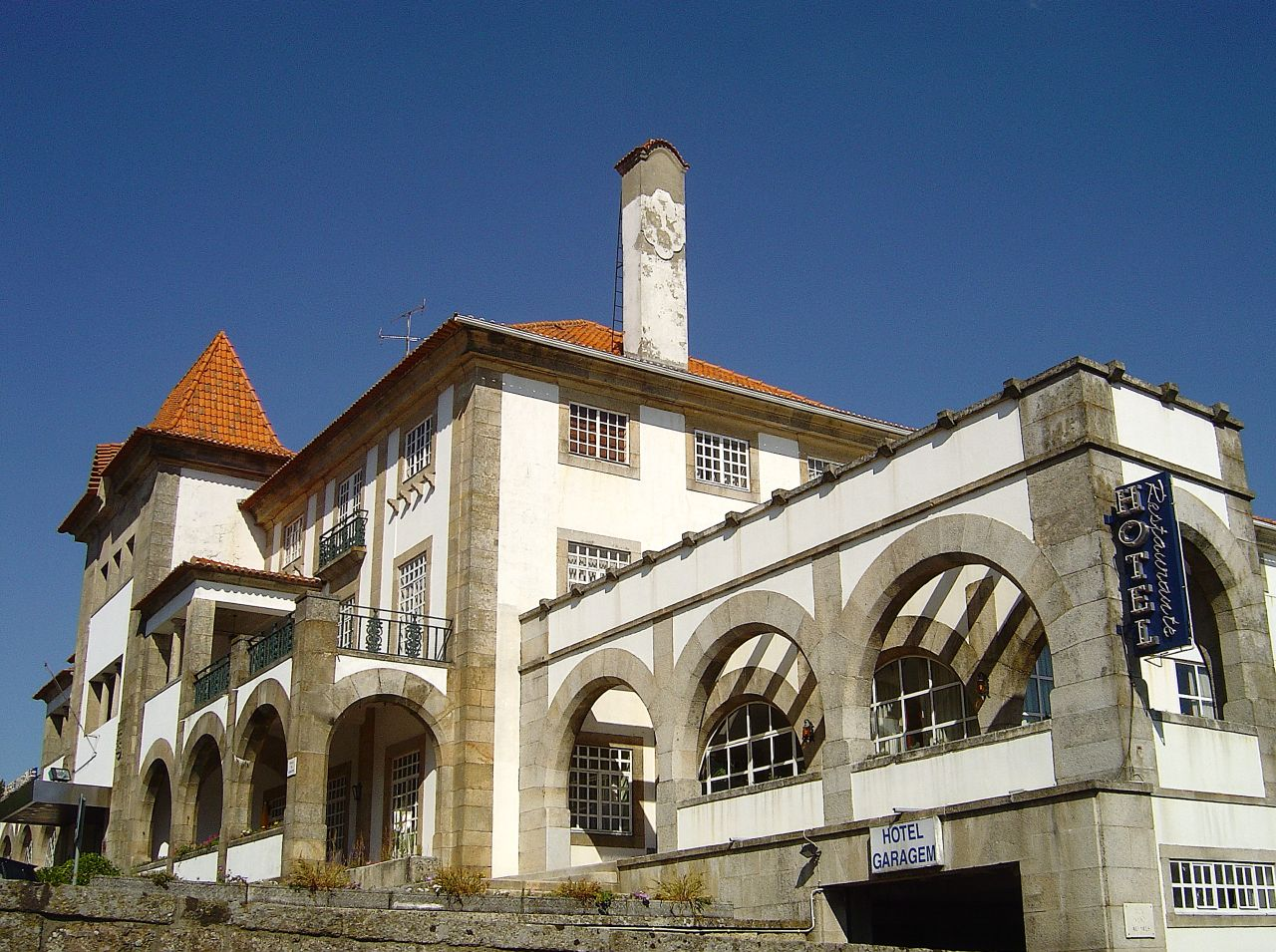
Former Hotel Turismo, Guarda.

=== In former overseas territories ===
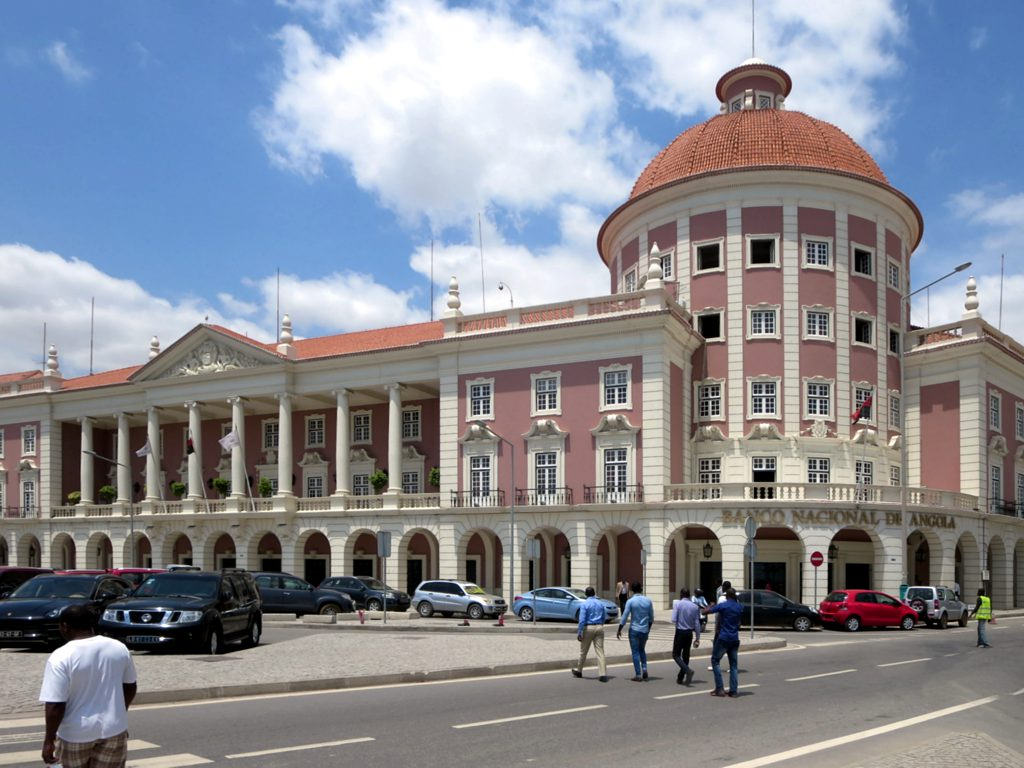
Central bank, Luanda, Angola

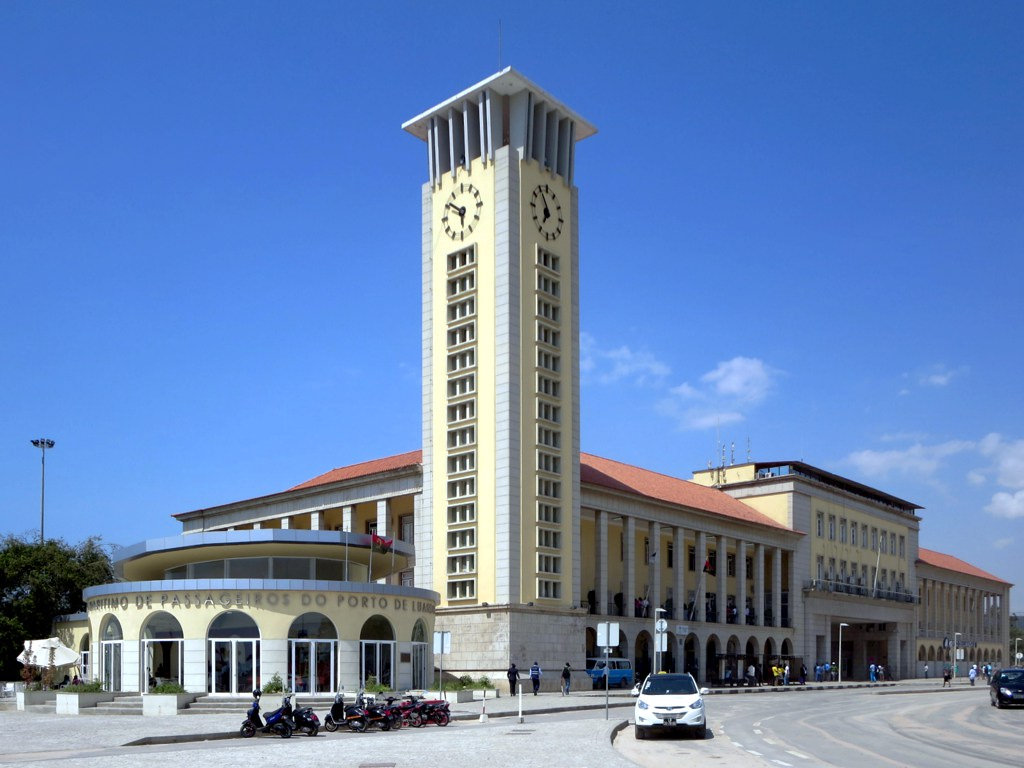
Maritime Station, Luanda, Angola

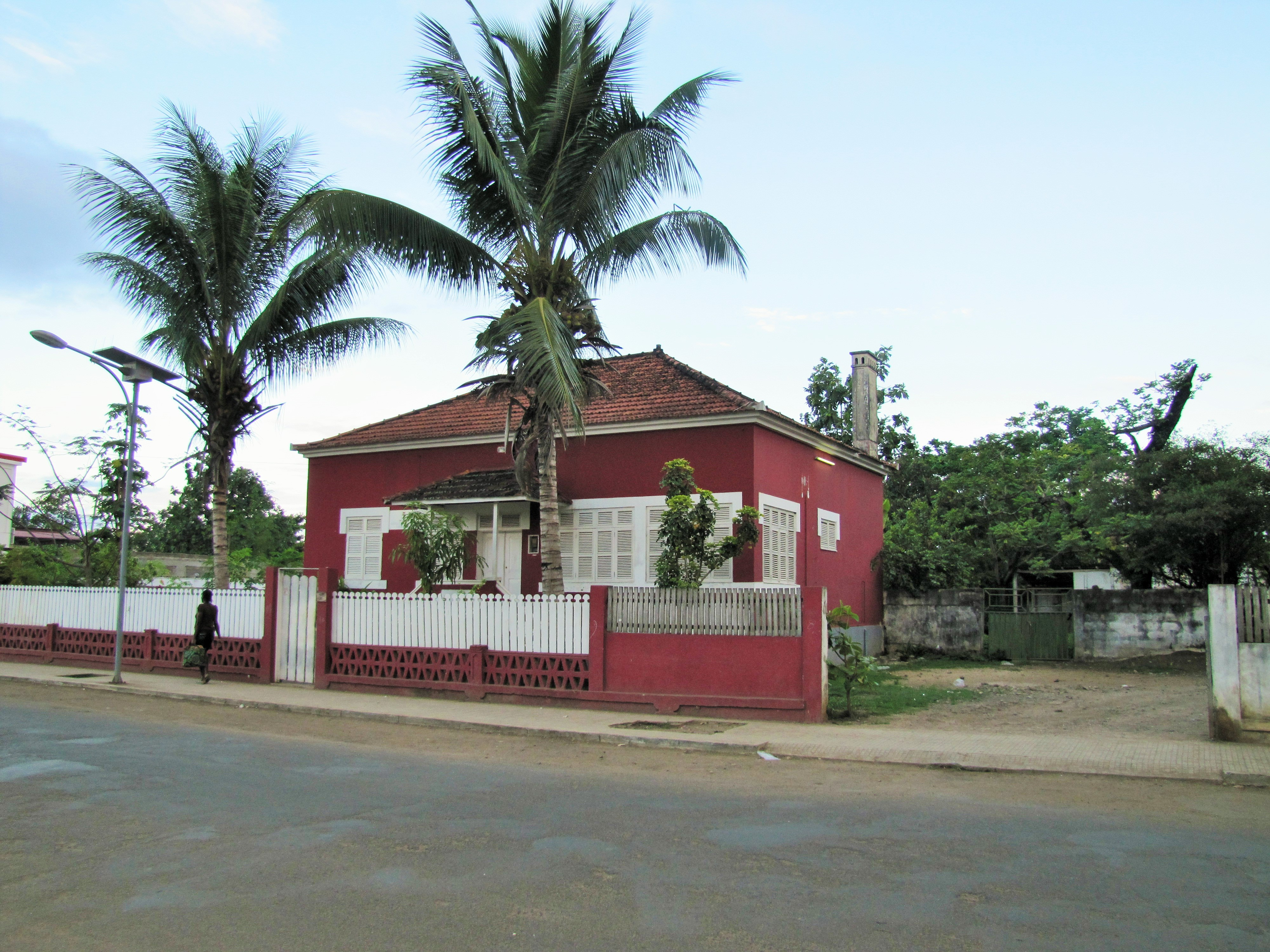
Residential home in São Tomé and Principe

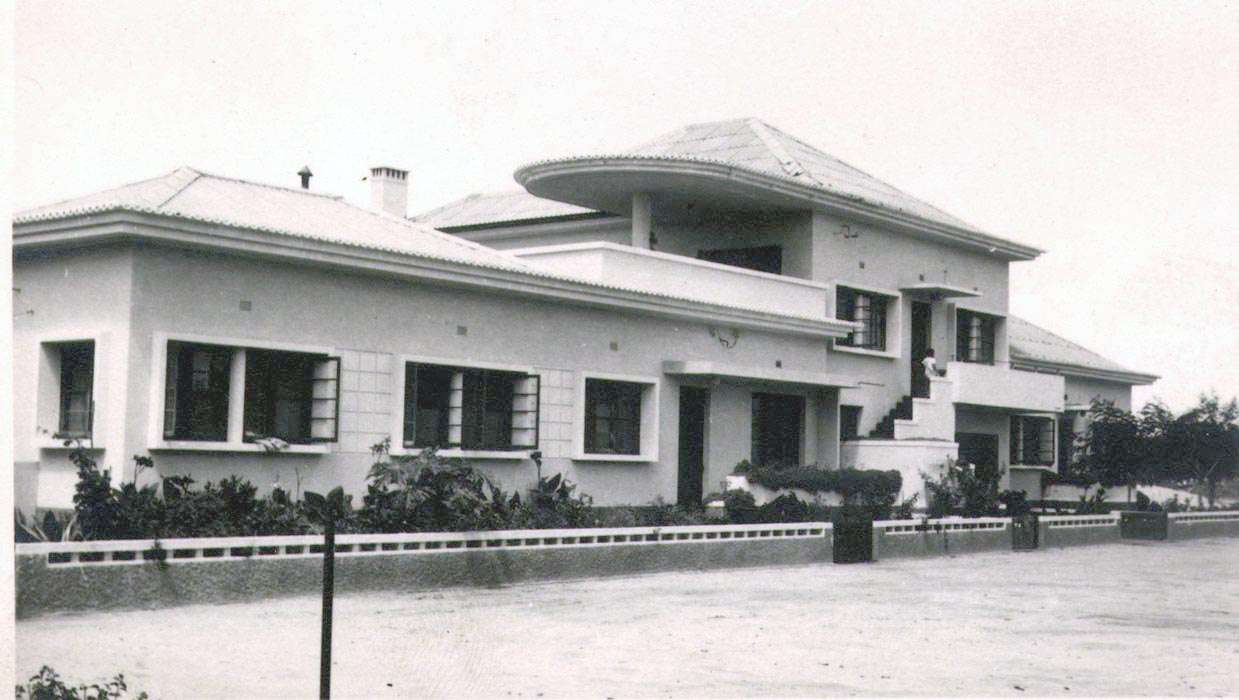
Seaside estate, Mozambique

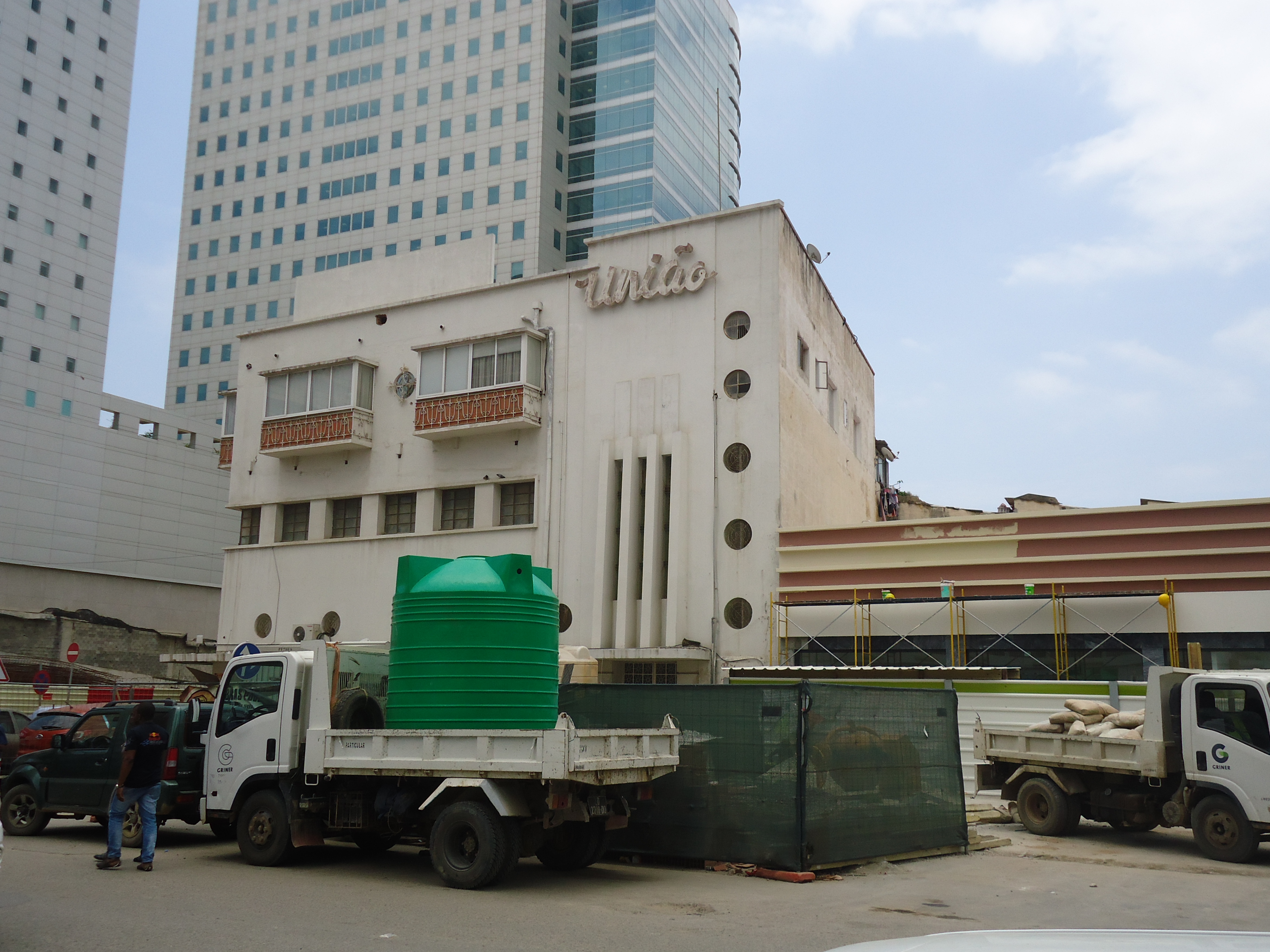
Building in Luanda, Angola.

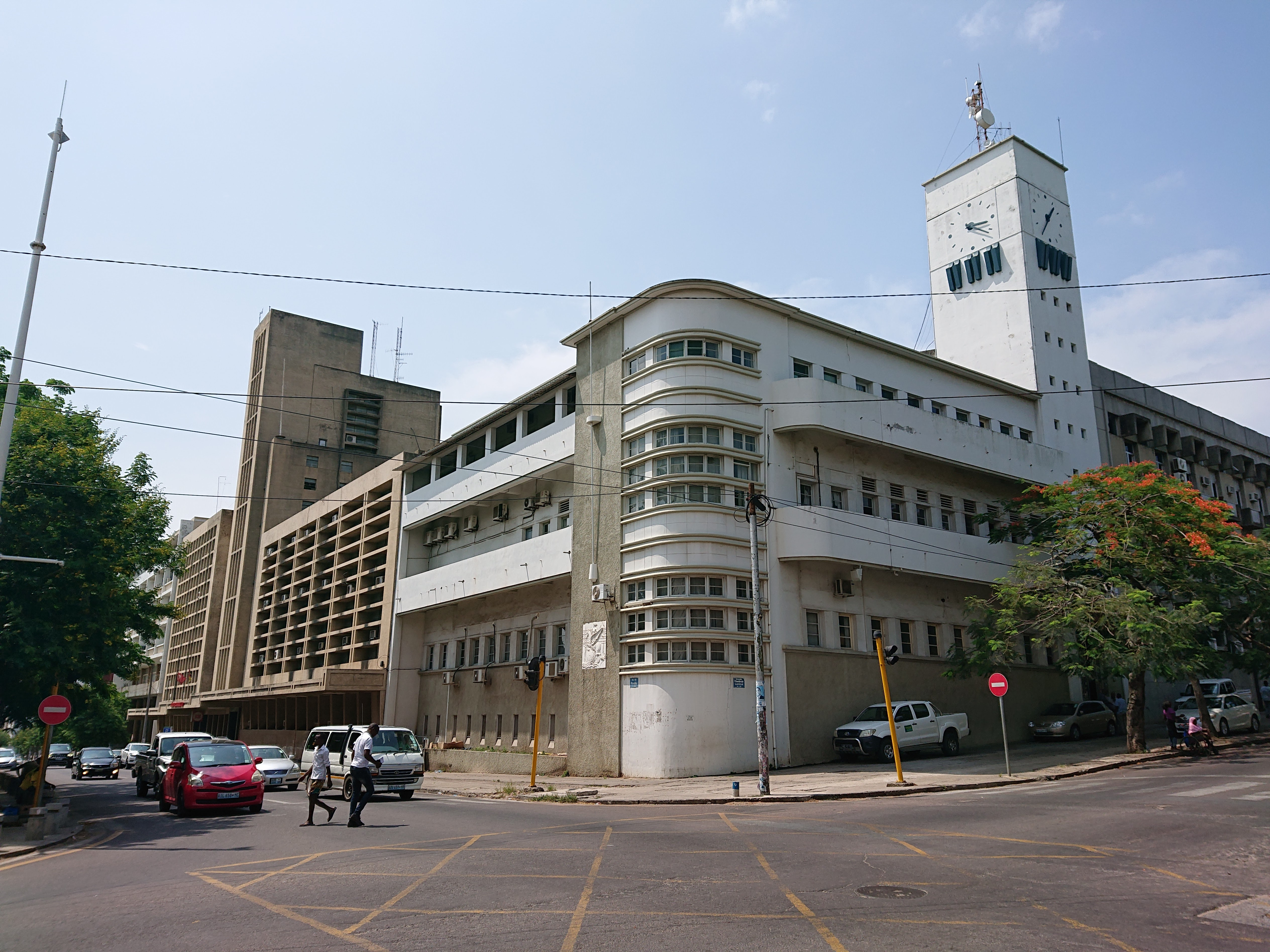
Telecommunications building, Maputo, Mozambique

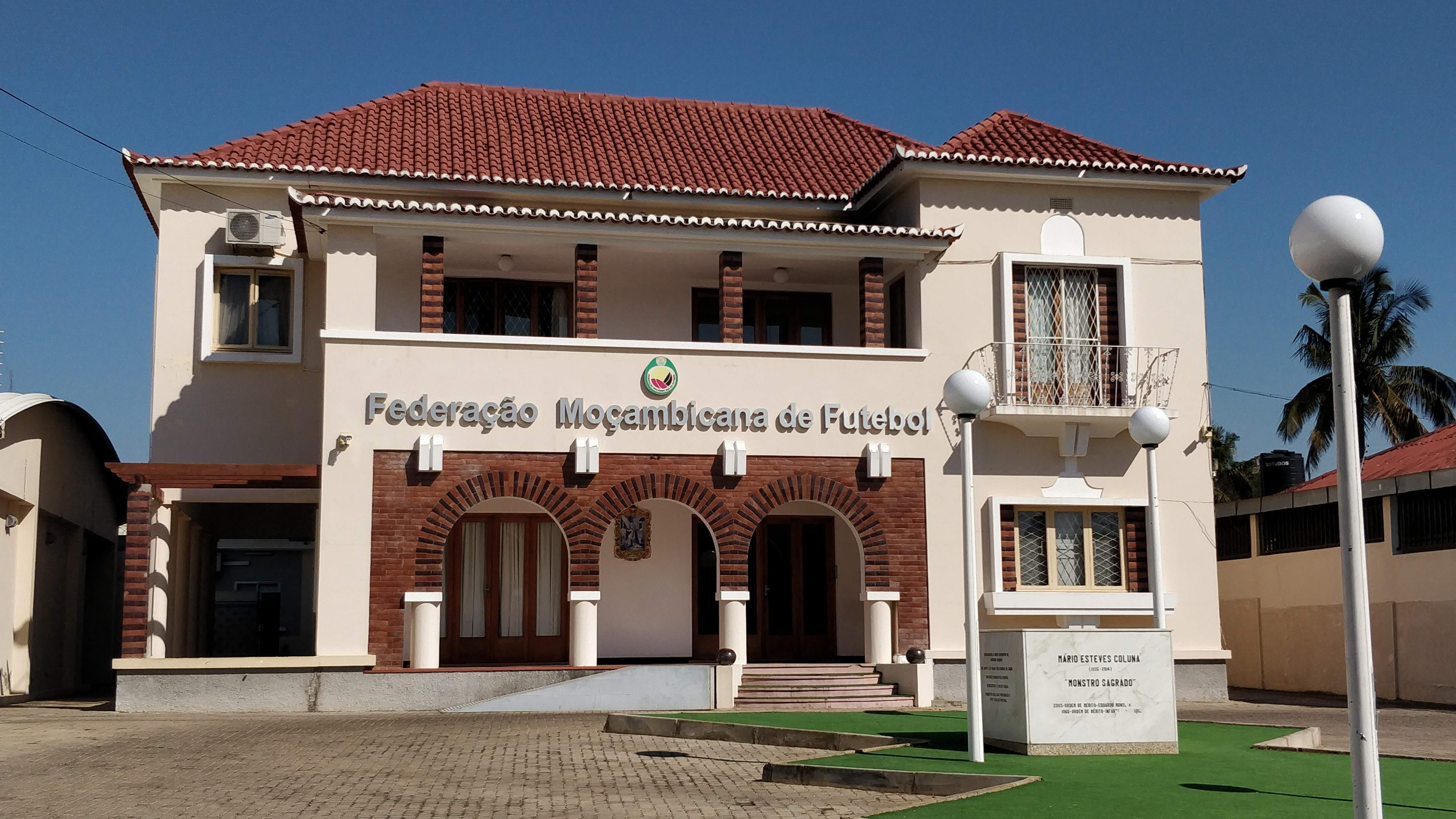
Building of the Mozambican Football Federation

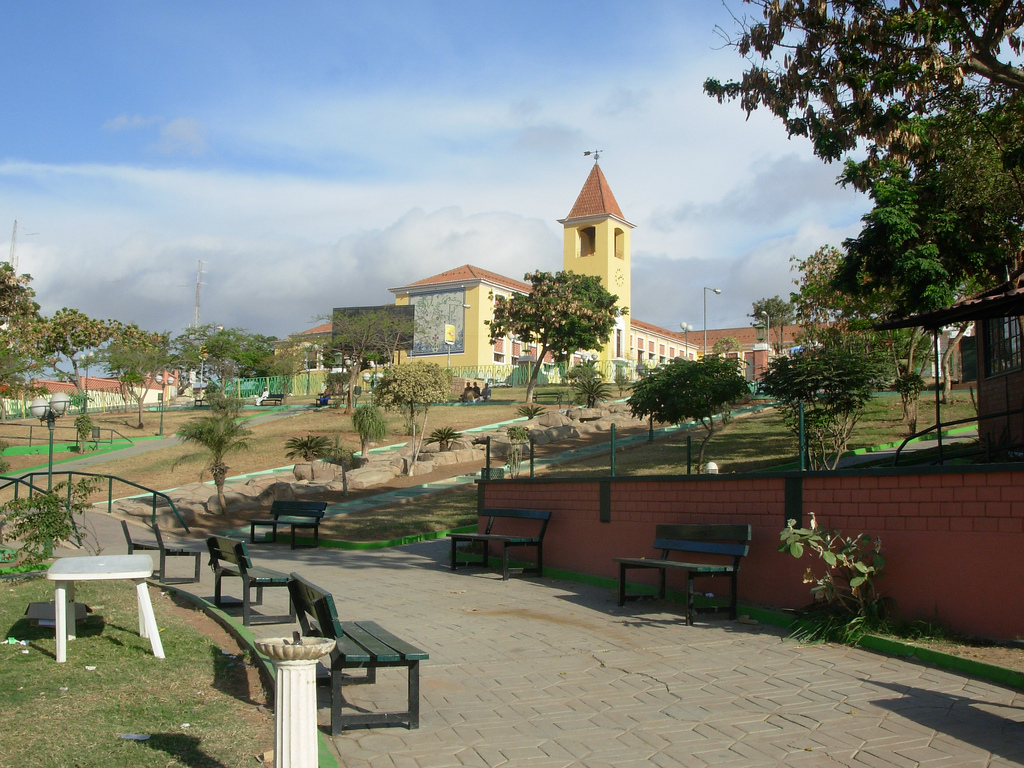
Salvador Correia High-school, Luanda, Angola

== See also ==
- List of architectural styles
