= Portuguese =

Portuguese may refer to:

- anything of, from, or related to the country and nation of Portugal
  - Portuguese cuisine, traditional foods
  - Portuguese language, a Romance language
    - Portuguese dialects, variants of the Portuguese language
  - Portuguese man o' war, a dangerous marine animal
  - Portuguese people, an ethnic group

== See also ==
- Sonnets from the Portuguese
- "A Portuguesa", the national anthem of Portugal
- Lusofonia
- Lusitania
- Portugues (disambiguation)
