= Português (cigarette) =

Former Portuguese cigarette brand

- Pack of Português Suave cigarettes
- Product type: Cigarette
- Current owner: Philip Morris International
- Produced by: Tabaqueira
- Country: Portugal
- Introduced: 1929; 97 years ago
- Discontinued: 2011; 15 years ago
- Markets: Portugal

Português (named Português Suave until 2001) was a Portuguese brand of cigarettes manufactured by Tabaqueira, a subsidiary of Philip Morris International.

== History ==
The brand was founded in 1929 during the Dictatorial Portugal regime and was one of the most popular brands in Portugal during the 1980s and 1990s. However, after foreign brands were introduced and started to dominate the market, the brand gradually lost appeal to Portuguese smokers. The original name of the brand was called "Português Suave" (literally "Smooth" or "Soft Portuguese"), but the name was changed in 2001 to respect the anti-tobacco laws that prohibit the sale of cigarettes with names like "smooth", "light" or "mild".

Português was one of the first unfiltered cigarettes in Portugal, and was one of the last to be discontinued in 2003, when the brand was sold with a filter only.

As of 2011, the variants "Português Vermelho (Red)" and "Português Azul (Blue)" have been discontinued.

== Packaging ==
The packs feature various colour patterns (red, blue, yellow, etc.) but it is mainly distinguished by the Belém Tower on the top of the pack. Português Suave was based on the architectural style with the same name, which marked the 1930s. The suave Portuguese style emerged from a chain of architects, at the beginning of the 20th century. Also known as the Estado Novo style, it sought to create a "genuinely Portuguese" architecture. The result was the creation of a style of architecture that introduced new engineering techniques, such as the use of concrete structures, which came to revolutionize not only the way of building but also the way of thinking about buildings. The style was a mixture of exterior aesthetic elements taken from the Portuguese architecture of the 17th and 18th centuries and the traditional houses of the various regions of Portugal. Various special edition versions have also been released over the years, containing other known Portuguese monuments on the packs.

== Controversy ==
=== Presence of pesticides in cigarettes ===
In November 2004, the newspaper Portugal Resident revealed that various Portuguese cigarette variants contained dieldrin, which is a banned carcinogenic pesticide in Europe and the United States. A few variants of the SG brand were found to contain this pesticide, but this pesticide was not found in the Português cigarettes.

== See also ==
- Soft Portuguese style - an architecture style named after the brand's former name
- Tobacco smoking
