= Marão =

Marão may refer to:

- Serra do Marão, a mountain in Portugal
- Marão (football manager), Brazilian football manager
